= Czech Society of Actuaries =

Association of actuaries in the Czech Republic

The Czech Society of Actuaries (CSA, Czech: Česká společnost aktuárů) is the association of actuaries in Czechia. It aims to promote education and research in actuarial science and to mediate social and professional contacts among actuaries.

The Society is a full member of the International Actuarial Association and the Actuarial Association of Europe. As of 2023, it has around 350 members, more than 110 of them fully qualified. Current chairman of the Society is Jan Šváb.

== History ==
=== Society of Czechoslovak Insurance Technicians ===
Actuarial science started to be taught at the Prague Polytechnic in 1904, and the first students graduated in 1907. By 1918, more than 170 graduates completed the course.

On 27 February 1919, the Society of Czechoslovak Insurance Technicians (Czech: Spolek československých pojistných techniků) was established. The Society aimed to associate insurance technicians and to support and promote interests of experts in fields of actuarial science and statistics.

The Society was a member of the Comité Permanent des Congrès Internationaux d'Actuaires and eighteen Czechoslovak actuaries took part at the first post-war International Congress of Actuaries in London in 1927.

In 1936, the Society of Czechoslovak Insurance Technicians had about 250 members and its long-time chairman was Václav Choděra.

After World War II and communist coup in 1948, there was little need for actuaries, and the Society ceased to exist.

=== Czech Society of Actuaries ===
The Czech Society of Actuaries was established in 1992 to resume the activities of the Society of Czechoslovak Insurance Technicians. Since the very beginning, the Society closely co-operates with the Department of Financial and Insurance Mathematics of the Faculty of Mathematics and Physics, Charles University, Prague. The Society and the University jointly organise a regular Actuarial Seminar (Czech: Aktuárský seminář, earlier Seminar in Actuarial Science). University examinations are also a common way to gain full membership of the association.

The Society represents Czech actuaries within international actuarial community. In 1998, it became a full member of the International Actuarial Association, and after the country's accession to the European Union in 2004, the Society has also become a full member of the Groupe Consultatif.

In 2019, the Czech Society of Actuaries celebrated a century of the existence of actuarial association in the country.

== Membership ==
The Czech Society of Actuaries offers three types of membership:

- Member
- Fellow (fully qualified member)
- Honorary member

Certificate of qualification is normally awarded on the following basis:

- Passing of the examinations prescribed by the Society
- Three years of successful work experience

As of 2023, the Society has 351 members. 113 of them are fully qualified.

== Examinations ==
The Society requires candidates to pass the following examinations at the Charles University, or equivalent:

- Life Insurance
- Non-life Insurance
- Risk Theory
- Introduction to Finance
- Finance Management
- Stochastic Financial Modelling
- Accounting of Insurers
- Insurance Law

The scope of the examinations complies with the Core Syllabus of the Actuarial Association of Europe.

== Past chairmen ==
- 1992-1995 Jaroslav Dostal
- 1995-2003 Petr Mandl
- 2003-2010 Jiří Fialka
- 2010-2013 Petr Bohumský
- 2013-2025 Jan Šváb
