= International Actuarial Association =

- International Actuarial Association logo
- Formation: 1895
- Headquarters: Ottawa, Canada
- President: Bozenna Hinton
- Website: www.actuaries.org

The International Actuarial Association (IAA) is a worldwide association of local professional actuarial associations.

== History ==
The IAA is the continuation of the Comité Permanent des Congrès d’Actuaires, established in 1895, as an association of individuals. It was renamed the IAA in 1968. At the 26th International Congress of Actuaries, held in Birmingham on 7–12 June 1998, the General Assembly of the International Actuarial Association restructured itself.

The restructuring created a single framework intended to coordinate the profession on international issues. The major responsibilities of the IAA now rest with the national actuarial associations, which represent actuaries in their respective countries and serve as the link between those actuaries and the wider international body. The IAA is an international organization dedicated to research, education, and the development of the actuarial profession and its associations.

== Sections ==
The IAA has six sections, AFIR-ERM, ASTIN, IAAHS, IAALS, IACA, PBSS.

=== Actuarial Approach for Financial Risks ===
The Actuarial Approach for Financial Risks (AFIR-ERM) section and was founded in 1988. It has as its objective the promotion of actuarial research in financial risks and enterprise risk management, and its most important function is the organizing of annual colloquia.

=== Actuarial Studies In Non-Life Insurance ===
The Actuarial Studies In Non-life insurance (ASTIN) section was founded in 1957. ASTIN organises annual colloquia and jointly publishes with the other sections, the ASTIN Bulletin, an internationally renowned referenced scientific journal.

=== International Actuarial Association Health Section ===
The International Actuarial Association Health Section (IAAHS) was founded in 2003 to provide an international perspective on health actuarial practice, public and private health insurance, and health policy matters.

=== International Actuarial Association Life Section ===
The International Actuarial Association Life Section (IAALS) has as its objectives to promote and facilitate an international exchange of views, advice, research and practical information among actuaries involved with life insurance issues.

=== International Association of Consulting Actuaries ===
The International Association of Consulting Actuaries (IACA) is the consulting section of the IAA.

The IACA first met in 1960, and was formally constituted in 1968. It held international meetings every other year to consider issues of concern to consulting actuaries. Much of the impetus for early meetings was stimulated by Max Lander and Geoffrey Heywood, who continued to play a prominent role in the Association for many years and were elected Emeritus Members of its Committee in 1976.

In 1999, following a restructuring of the IAA, the IACA was admitted as the consulting section of the IAA.

=== Pensions, Benefits and Social Security ===
The Pensions, Benefits, Social Security Section (PBSS) was founded in 2003 to serve actuaries around the world who have personal, professional, educational or research interests in social protection and the commercial, social and public policy issues concerning the provision of pensions and other benefits.

== Governance ==
The IAA Council comprises the President whose term of office is one year, the officers and one delegate per full member association and one delegate per section. The committees and the council normally meet twice a year in different countries.

The Officers for the period January 1, 2026 to December 31, 2026 are:

- Mike Lombardi, President
- Maximillian Happacher, President-Elect
- Bozenna Hinton, Immediate Past President

The Council elects an Executive Committee to coordinate activities and operations, and propose strategies, budgets, membership fees and Council meeting venues. The President chairs the Executive Committee, which comprises the Officers and 8 elected at-large members.

== Member associations ==
Currently, the IAA has 73 full member associations, 24 associate member associations, six partners organisations and 3 patrons. All individual actuaries can elect to join any section of the IAA, which currently are ASTIN, AFIR-ERM, IACA, IAAHS, IAALS and PBSS by paying the required contribution.

=== Full members ===
- Professional Council of Economic Sciences of the City of Buenos Aires
- Actuaries Institute Australia
- Austrian Actuarial Society
- Institute of Actuaries in Belgium
- Actuarial Association in Bosnia and Herzegovina
- Brazilian Institute of Actuaries
- Bulgarian Actuarial Society
- Canadian Institute of Actuaries
- China Association of Actuaries
- Colombian Association of Actuaries
- Croatian Actuarial Association
- Cyprus Association of Actuaries
- Czech Society of Actuaries
- Ecuadorian Actuarial Association
- Danish Society of Actuaries
- Egyptian Society of Actuaries
- Estonian Actuarial Society
- Actuarial Society of Finland
- Institute of Actuaries of France
- German Actuarial Society
- Actuarial Society of Ghana
- Hellenic Actuarial Society (Greece)
- Actuarial Society of Hong Kong
- Hungarian Actuarial Society
- Society of Icelandic Actuaries
- Institute of Actuaries of India
- Society of Actuaries of Indonesia
- Society of Actuaries in Ireland
- Israel Association of Actuaries
- Italian Institute of Actuaries
- Institute of Actuaries of Japan
- Japanese Society of Certified Pension Actuaries
- Actuarial Society of Kazakhstan
- Actuarial Society of Kenya
- Latvian Actuarial Association
- Lebanese Association of Actuaries
- Lithuanian Actuarial Society
- Luxembourg Actuarial Association
- Macedonian Actuarial Association
- Actuarial Society of Malaysia
- National Association of Actuaries (Mexico)
- Moroccan Association of Actuaries
- Actuarial Society of the Netherlands
- New Zealand Society of Actuaries
- Nigerian Actuarial Society
- Norwegian Society of Actuaries
- Pakistan Society of Actuaries
- Actuarial Society of the Philippines
- Polish Society of Actuaries
- Portuguese Institute of Actuaries
- Romanian Actuarial Association
- Russian Guild of Actuaries
- Serbian Association of Actuaries
- Singapore Actuarial Society
- Slovak Society of Actuaries
- Slovenian Association of Actuaries
- Actuarial Society of South Africa
- Institute of Actuaries of Korea (South Korea)
- Spanish Institute of Actuaries
- Catalan Actuarial Association (Spain)
- Actuarial Association of Sri Lanka
- Swedish Society of Actuaries
- Swiss Association of Actuaries
- Actuarial Institute of Chinese Taipei
- Society of Actuaries of Thailand
- Actuarial Society of Turkey
- American Society of Pension Professionals and Actuaries
- Conference of Consulting Actuaries (United States)
- Caribbean Actuarial Association
- Central American Actuaries Association
- Institute and Faculty of Actuaries
- Casualty Actuarial Society
- Society of Actuaries

=== Associate members ===
- Albanian Actuarial Association
- Institute of Actuaries of Argentina
- Actuarial Society of Armenia
- Actuarial Association of Azerbaijan
- Association pour la Promotion des Sciences Actuarielles (APSA) (Benin)
- Actuarial Association of the Republic of Srpska (Bosnia and Herzegovina)
- Channel Islands Actuarial Society
- Institute of Actuaries of Chile
- Association of Actuaries and Financial Analysts (Georgia)
- Actuarial Society of Iran
- Mexican Association of Actuaries
- Moldovan Actuarial Association
- Society of Actuaries of Mongolia
- Actuarial Association of Montenegro
- Society of Actuaries of Namibia
- Actuarial Society of Nepal
- Association of Actuaries of Panama
- Association of Professional Actuaries (Russia)
- Institut National des Actuaires au Sénégal (Senegal)
- Actuarial Society of Tanzania
- Actuarial Association of Togo
- Society of Actuaries of Ukraine
- Actuarial Society of Zambia
- Actuarial Society of Zimbabwe

=== Partners ===
- International Accounting Standards Board
- International Association of Insurance Supervisors
- International Organisation of Pension Supervisors
- International Social Security Association
- Organisation for Economic Co-operation and Development
- Sustainable Insurance Forum

=== Observers ===
Actuaires du Monde

=== Patrons ===
- Reinsurance Group of America
- Milliman
- Istituto Nazionale per l'Assicurazione contro gli Infortuni sul Lavoro e le malattie professionali

== Publications ==
- ASTIN Bulletin - The Journal of the International Actuarial Association (ISSN 0515-0361)
- Stochastic Modeling – Theory and Reality from an Actuarial Perspective (ISBN 978-0-9813968-2-8)
- Discount Rates in Financial Reporting A Practical Guide (ISBN 978-0-9813968-3-5)
- Risk Adjustments for Insurance Contracts Under IFRS 17 (ISBN 978-0-9813968-4-2)

== Past presidents ==
- 1895-1896 - Léon Mahillon
- 1896-1909 - Omer Lepreux
- 1909-1946 - Amédée Bégault
- 1946-1950 - Léon François
- 1950-1964 - Albert Théate
- 1964-1984 - Edouard Franckx
- 1987-1988 - Henri Rijkers
- 1988-1998 - André Lamens
- 1995-1996 - Paul McCrossan^{†}
- 1996-1997 - Christopher Daykin^{†}
- 1997-1998 - Walter S. Rugland^{†}
- 1998-1999 - Jean Berthon
- 2000 - Catherine M. Prime
- 2001 - Morris W. Chambers
- 2002 - Edward J. Levay
- 2003 - W. James MacGinnitie
- 2004 - Luis Huerta
- 2005 - Alf Guldberg
- 2006 - Jean-Louis Massé
- 2007 - Hillevi Mannonen
- 2008 - David G. Hartman
- 2009 - Katsumi Hikasa
- 2010 - Paul N. Thornton
- 2011 - Cecil D. Bykerk
- 2012 - Desmond K. Smith
- 2013 - Kurt Wolfsdorf
- 2014 - Robert L. Brown
- 2015 - Frederick Rowley
- 2016 - Malcolm Campbell
- 2017 - Thomas S. Terry
- 2018 - Masaaki Yoshimura
- 2019 - Gábor Hanák
- 2020 - Tonya B. Manning
- 2021 - Jan Kars
- 2022 - Roseanne Harris
- 2023 - Micheline Dionne
- 2024 - Charles Cowling
- 2025 - Bozenna Hinton

^{†}Chairmen of the International Forum of Actuarial Associations

== Medallists of the IAA ==
- 2001 - Hans Bühlmann
- 2001 - Max Lacroix
- 2008 - Paul McCrossan
- 2010 - Yves Guérard
- 2014 - Christopher Daykin
- 2025 - Gábor Hanák
