= Petr Mandl =

Czech mathematician (1933–2012)

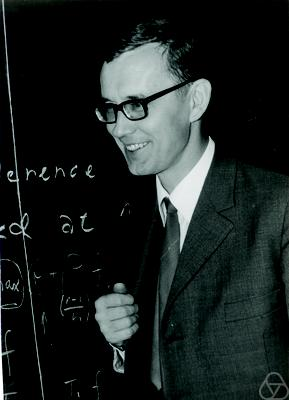
- Mandl in 1971
- Born: 5 November 1933; Plzeň, Czechoslovakia
- Died: 24 February 2012 (aged 78); Sušice, Czechia
- Occupation: Mathematician
- Title: Chairman of the Czech Society of Actuaries
- Term: 1995 - 2003
- Predecessor: Jaroslav Dostal
- Successor: Jiří Fialka
- Father: Vladimír Mandl

Professor Petr Mandl DSc (5 November 1933 – 24 February 2012) was a Czech mathematician known for his contributions to the fields of stochastic processes and actuarial science. He published several books and more than hundred articles.

Petr Mandl was a founding member, former chairman and honorary chairman of the Czech Society of Actuaries.

== Biography ==
Mandl was born in Plzeň, Czechoslovakia on 5 November 1933. His father was Vladimír Mandl. In 1957, he graduated at the Faculty of Mathematics and Physics, Charles University, Prague. After twenty years spent at the Czechoslovak Academy of Sciences he returned to the university as a lecturer. In 1992, he revived studies of actuarial science in Czechoslovakia by introducing a course of Financial and Insurance Mathematics within the Department of Probability and Mathematical Statistics. For many years he tirelessly organised a Seminar in Actuarial Science (Czech: Seminář z aktuárských věd) at University premises.

Petr Mandl was a founding member of the Czech Society of Actuaries. In December 1995, he was elected chairman of the Society and re-elected twice in 1998 and 2001. During Mandl's tenure, the Society reached international recognition when it became a full member of the International Actuarial Association and an observer member of the Groupe Consultatif. Petr Mandl also initiated a change of rules for certification of Society members. In 2003, Mandl stepped down as chairman and was replaced by Jiří Fialka. Soon afterwards he has been elected honorary chairman of the Society.

In 2009, he was awarded a Medal of Merit by the president of Czech Republic for his services to the state in the field of science.

Petr Mandl died on 24 February 2012.

== Controversy ==
While Mandl was much respected for his expertise and breadth of knowledge he was also disliked for his poor lecturing and autocratic behaviour.

== Selected publications ==
- Mandl, Petr: Analytical treatment of one-dimensional Markov processes, Academia, Springer, 1968.
- Mandl, Petr: Pravděpodobnostní dynamické modely, Academia, 1985. (in Czech)
