= Government spending in the United Kingdom =

2023–24 UK government spending
- Presented: 15 March 2023
- Passed: 11 July 2023
- Total revenue: £1,058 billion
- Total expenditures: £1,189 billion
- Deficit: £131 billion
- GDP: £2,650 billion
- Website: https://www.gov.uk/government/topical-events/spring-budget-2023

Government spending in the United Kingdom, also referred to as public expenditure, is the total spent by Central Government departments and certain other bodies as authorised by Parliament through the Estimates process. It includes net spending by the three devolved governments: the Scottish Government, the Welsh Government and the Northern Ireland Executive.

For the financial year 2023–24, total government spending is expected to be £1,189 billion.

The UK government has spent more than it has raised in taxation since financial year 2001–02, creating a budget deficit and leading to growing debt interest payments.

Average government spending per person is higher in Scotland, Wales and Northern Ireland than it is in England. In financial year 2021–22, spending per head in England was £15.2k, whereas in Scotland it was £17.7k, in Wales it was £16.9k and in Northern Ireland it was £17.5k.

== Components of government spending ==
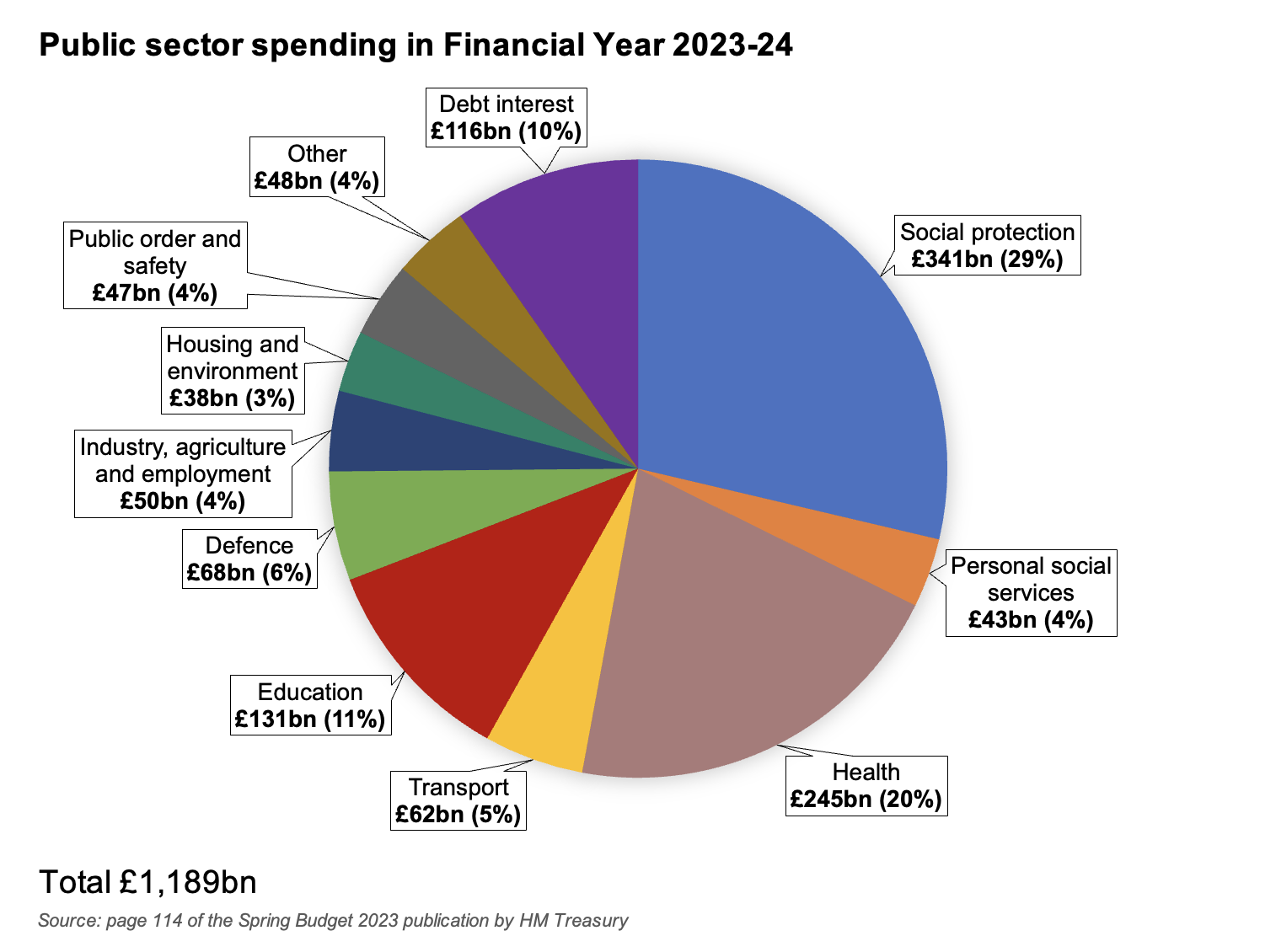
Pie chart of UK government spending, 2023–24.

The most significant area of government spending is welfare (£341 billion in financial year 2023–24), with the largest single element of this being for the State Pension, which totals £124 billion. Other kinds of welfare payment such as Universal Credit sum to £83 billion, while £35 billion is spent on disability benefits.

Elsewhere, significant public spending is dedicated to health as a result of the taxpayer-funded National Health Service. In financial year 2023–24, £177 billion is budgeted for NHS England.

Around half of the funding Local Authorities receive in England is through central government spending, principally from the Department for Levelling Up, Housing and Communities. This comes in the form of both a core grant to councils to cover operating costs, known as the Local Government Finance Settlement, and grants for specific initiatives such as the Levelling Up Fund.

Debt interest has grown as a proportion of government spending in the last few years as a result of rising interest rates, and increased debt due to primarily to the cost of the COVID pandemic. In financial year 2018–19, debt interest was £43 billion - around 5% of total government spending compared to around 10% in 2023–24.

HM Treasury controls the overall budget for administration in central government, which largely comprises staff costs. In 2023–24, this totalled £14 billion.

== Capital spending ==
Central government spending can be broken down into capital and revenue (also known in government as 'resource') spending. Capital is often scrutinised as a measure of government investment in public services, such as on buildings, equipment and IT.

Government capital spending in 2023-24 totals £134 billion, with the biggest spending departments being the Department for Transport, the Ministry of Defence and the Department for Science, Innovation and Technology, which together comprise around half of all capital spending.

Some of the largest capital projects being run by central government at the moment include HS2 and the Dreadnought programme.

== Recent history ==
Government spending has grown significantly since the COVID-19 pandemic. The table below shows total government spending over the previous five financial years and the plans for the subsequent two years, which form the remainder of this Spending Review period.

£billion	Outturn						Plans
£billion	2018–19	2019–20	2020–21	2021–22	2022–23	2023–24	2024–25
Public sector gross investment	98	95	126	104	113	131	136
Public sector current expenditure	761	793	981	938	1,042	1,097	1,140
Total managed expenditure	858	889	1,107	1,041	1,155	1228	1,276

== Local government spending ==
Local government spending is the responsibility of local authorities, under the supervision of the respective national governments:

- English local authorities, under the supervision of the Secretary of State for Housing, Communities and Local Government
- Scottish local authorities, under the supervision of the Cabinet Secretary for Finance and Local Government
- Welsh local authorities, under the supervision of the Cabinet Secretary for Local Government
- Northern Ireland local authorities, under the supervision of the Department for Communities

== See also ==
- Barnett Formula
- Fiscal autonomy for Scotland
- History of the English fiscal system
- People's Quantitative Easing
- Taxation in the United Kingdom
- United Kingdom budget, the budget of the UK government
- United Kingdom government austerity programme
- United Kingdom national debt

By nation

- Northern Ireland fiscal deficit
- Welsh fiscal deficit

International

- Government budget by country
- List of countries by tax revenue as percentage of GDP
