= Max Lacroix =

- Born: 9 February 1913
- Died: 6 January 2009 (aged 95)
- Occupation: Actuary
- Title: Chairman of the Groupe Consultatif Actuariel Européen
- Term: 1978 - 1988

Max Lacroix (9 February 1913 – 6 January 2009) was a distinguished French actuary. He was the founding chairman of the Actuarial Association of Europe and served as its chairman from 1978 to 1988. In 1990, he was elected as an honorary chairman.

In 2001, he was awarded with the International Actuarial Association Medal.
