= Polish Society of Actuaries =

Organization of Poland

The Polish Society of Actuaries (PSA, Polish: Polskie Stowarzyszenie Aktuariuszy) is the association of actuaries in Poland. The society was established in 1991 to resume activities of the Polish Institute of Actuaries founded in 1920. It is a full member of the International Actuarial Association and the Groupe Consultatif.

== Membership ==
The Polish Society of Actuaries offers three types of membership:

- Student
- Associate
- Fellow
