= Hellenic Actuarial Society =

Organization of Greece

The Hellenic Actuarial Society (HAS; Greek: Ένωση Αναλογιστών Ελλάδος (EAE)) is the association of actuaries in Greece. The society was established in 1979. It is a full member of the International Actuarial Association and the Groupe Consultatif. As of 2007, the society has about 100 full members. The current chairman of the society is Iraklis Daskalopoulos.

== Past chairperson ==
- 1979-1980 Ioannis Kalkanis
- 1980-1991 Konstantinos Koutsopoulos
- 1992-1995 Konstantinos Gionis
- 1996-1999 Spyridon Grivogiannis
- 2000-2003 Anastasios Pagonis
- Since 2004 Iraklis Daskalopoulos
