= SSA =

SSA or ssa may refer to:

== Geography ==
- Sub-Saharan Africa

== Organizations ==
- Sainsbury's Staff Association
- Schonfeld Strategic Advisors, an American hedge fund
- Scottish Socialist Alliance, a coalition of left-wing bodies, fore-runner to the Scottish Socialist Party
- Seismological Society of America, an international scientific society founded 1906
- Shan State Army, a former insurgent group in Burma
- Shipconstructors' and Shipwrights' Association, a former British trade union
- Singapore Scout Association, a youth movement founded in 1910
- Slovak Society of Actuaries (Slovak: Slovenská spoločnosť aktuárov), a professional association in Slovakia
- Soaring Society of America, an American sporting society founded in 1932
- Society for the Study of Addiction, a British society with charitable status
- Society of Scottish Artists, an artists society founded in 1891
- SSA Global Technologies, an American software company acquired by Infor Global Solutions
- Steamship Authority, a Massachusetts ferry service and regulatory body
- Sudan Studies Association, an American professional association
- Swedish Society of Radio Amateurs, an amateur radio organization

=== Education ===
- School of Saint Anthony, Quezon City, Philippines
- Secular Student Alliance, United States
- Shady Side Academy, Pittsburgh, Pennsylvania, United States

=== Government ===
- Saudi Space Agency, a Saudi government agency
- Senior Special Assistant, a Nigeria government role
- Social Security Administration, an independent agency of the U.S. federal government
- Social Security Agency (Northern Ireland)
- Selective Service Act of 1917, an American piece of legislation signed by President Woodrow Wilson during WWI that established nationwide conscription
- State Security Agency (South Africa), a South African intelligence service

== Computing ==
- Stochastic Simulation Algorithm
- Serial Storage Architecture
- Singular Spectrum Analysis
- Software Security Assurance
- Solid State Array, in flash data storage using solid-state drives
- Start of Selected Area, a control character in the C1 control code set
- Static single-assignment form, a property of intermediate representations used in compilers
- Stationary Subspace Analysis
- Strong subadditivity of quantum entropy
- SubStation Alpha and .ssa file format, a video subtitle editor
- Super systolic array

== Science ==
- Semantic structure analysis
- Single-strand annealing in homologous recombination
- Side-side-angle in geometry for solving triangles
- Specific surface area, a property of solids

=== Medicine ===
- Anti-SSA/Ro autoantibodies
- Senile systemic amyloidosis
- Sessile serrated adenoma, a type of pre-malignant intestinal polyp
- Special somatic afferent
- Sulfosalicylic acid

== Other uses ==
- ESA Space Situational Awareness Programme
- Same-sex attraction
- Sarva Shiksha Abhiyan, the Government of India's Education for All programme
- Self-sampling assumption
- Serious Sam Advance, a 2004 video game
- Shared services agreement
- Slippery slope argument, a rhetorical device (and often a fallacy)
- Special Service Agreement, between the UN and a contractor
- Special services area or business improvement district
- SSA, Grand Cross of the Order of the Star of South Africa
- Supervisory Special Agent
- Salvador Bahia Airport, an IATA code
- Nilo-Saharan languages, ISO 639-2 and ISO 639-5 codes
