= IAE =

IAE or Iae may refer to:

- Institut d'Administration des Entreprises, graduate schools of management in France
- International Aero Engines
- IAE Universidad Austral, the Management and Business School of the Universidad Austral
- Spanish Institute of Actuaries
- Ignalina Nuclear Power Plant
- Inside American Education, a 1992 book by economist Thomas Sowell about education in the United States
- International Association of Egyptologists

IAe may refer to:

- Indonesian Aerospace, an Indonesian aerospace company
