= Canadian Institute of Actuaries =

Canadian professional body

Canadian Institute of Actuaries (CIA)/Institut canadien des actuaires (ICA)
- Canadian Institute of Actuaries logo
- Formation: 1965
- Type: Professional body
- Headquarters: Ottawa, Ontario, Canada
- Members: 7,500+
- Official language: English and French
- President: Daniel Pellerin, FCIA
- Executive Director: Alicia Rollo, CHRL
- Website: cia-ica.ca

The Canadian Institute of Actuaries (CIA) is the national organization of the actuarial profession in Canada. It was incorporated March 18, 1965. The FCIA designation stands for Fellow of the Canadian Institute of Actuaries. As the national organization of the Canadian actuarial profession, the CIA serves the public through the provision by the profession of actuarial services and advice by: representing the Canadian actuarial profession in the formulation of public policy; promoting the advancement of actuarial science; educating and qualifying CIA members; ensuring that actuarial services provided by its members meet accepted professional standards; and assisting actuaries in Canada in the discharge of their professional responsibilities.

== History ==
The beginning of the actuarial profession in Canada can be dated to 1847, when the Canada Life Assurance Company was founded in Hamilton, Ontario, by Hugh Baker, who became a Fellow of the Institute of Actuaries in 1852. The federal Department of Insurance was established in 1875 and shortly thereafter recruited actuaries to its staff. The first actuarial organization in North America was the Actuarial Society of America, founded in 1889 in New York City and included four Canadians among its 38 charter members.

The original organization of actuaries in Canada, the Actuaries Club, was founded in 1907 with 24 charter members, all actuaries living and working in Toronto. The Canadian Association of Actuaries was established October 8, 1946, and included all members of the Actuaries Clubs of Toronto and Winnipeg as well as a group of Montreal actuaries. This was the organization that formed the membership basis of the CIA when it was established by an Act of Parliament on March 18, 1965.

Following competitions, the Institute adopted the motto Nobis Cura Futuri, meaning We care about the future. A formal bilingualism policy was adopted by the Institute in 1977.

== Profession oversight ==
The Actuarial Profession Oversight Board (APOB) was established by the CIA to provide independent and objective public oversight of the actuarial profession in Canada.

APOB maintains a broad, public-oriented perspective on issues facing actuaries. Its membership comes from the industry, business, regulatory bodies, organized labor, and other professions. It also has three members appointed by the CIA Board its membership, ensuring subject-matter expertise in actuarial matters, and providing insight into APOB operations.

APOB is entirely independent in its operations and directly oversees the key regulatory functions of the Institute; namely, actuarial standard-setting, continuing professional development, and professional conduct. APOB also provides the CIA Board with its public-oriented perspective on other CIA activities managed by the CIA councils, which report to the CIA Board.

== Legislation and actuaries ==
Several regulations and pieces of legislation, both federal and provincial, specify roles that can only be fulfilled by individuals holding the designation of Fellow of the Canadian Institute of Actuaries (FCIA).

In 1991, the federal Insurance Companies Act enshrined the role of Appointed Actuary in federal legislation. This role includes a formal designation from the boards of directors of all insurance companies and includes access to management information; a report in writing of any transactions or conditions which, in the actuary's opinion, have a significant adverse effect on the financial condition of the company; an annual report to boards of directors; and a report by the Appointed Actuary accompanying the published financial statements of companies.

Other roles reserved for FCIAs include the certification of defined-benefit pension plan valuations, filing responsibility for auto insurance rates, and the determination of interest rates in cases where the rate charged possibly exceeds the maximum stipulated in the Criminal Code of Canada.

The Canadian Institute of Actuaries Standards of Practice are defined and referenced in provincial pension benefits acts and regulations, such as in Ontario and Quebec.

== Public policy activities ==
The CIA produces different types of public statements to address issues of public policy in Canada and to respond to public consultations by governments and regulatory bodies. As a non-partisan entity, the CIA’s policy activities focus on offering input and advice to the benefit of the public good and all Canadians. Recent policy statements by the CIA have addressed topics such as nature risk, retirement age, climate change, pharmacare, and big data and risk classification.

== News about actuaries ==
The CIA publishes articles in English and French about actuaries and the actuarial profession in Canada.

== Actuarial Foundation of Canada ==
In November 2001, the CIA Board authorized the development of the Actuarial Foundation of Canada (AFC), which was founded in December 2003 to support youth education, consumer education, and research initiatives that use actuarial science and skills in the public interest.

The AFC pursues a variety of goals through giving and receiving grants and focusing on education, research, and consumer-education initiatives for the public and young Canadians especially.

== Leadership ==
=== President ===
- 1965 – C. A. Naylor
- 1965 – R. Humphrys
- 1966 – E. S. Jackson
- 1967 – A. R. McCracken
- 1968 – C. E. Jack
- 1969 – L. E. Coward
- 1970 – J. C. Davidson
- 1971 – L. J. Mondoux
- 1972 – J. C. Maynard
- 1973 – R. C. Dowsett
- 1974 – C. G. White
- 1975 – R. B. Leckie
- 1976 – M. D. R. Brown
- 1977 – W. J. D. Lewis
- 1978 – T. R. Suttie
- 1979 – J. T. Birkenshaw
- 1980 – C. T. P. Galloway
- 1981 – L. B. Fewster
- 1982 – Y. G. Guérard
- 1983 – C. D. Chapman
- 1984 – C. S. Moore
- 1985 – M. Rosenfelder
- 1986 – K. T. Clark
- 1987 – J. D. Crawford
- 1988 – J. Cloutier
- 1989 – P. C. Hirst
- 1990 – R. L. Brown
- 1991 – W. P. McCrossan
- 1992 – M. W. Chambers
- 1993 – J. A. Brierley
- 1994 – K. K. von Schilling
- 1995 – M. Fernet
- 1996 – N. S. Henderson
- 1997 – H. H. Panjer
- 1998 – P. F. Morse
- 1999 – S. F. Wason
- 2000 – D. J. Oakden
- 2001 – J.-L. Massé
- 2002 – A. D. Pelletier
- 2003 – M. Lombardi
- 2004 – B. A. P. FitzGerald
- 2005 – C. C. McLeod
- 2006 – N. Gendron
- 2007 – J. H. Murta
- 2008 – M. A. Hale
- 2009 – R. C. W. Howard
- 2010 – Micheline Dionne
- 2011 – Jim Christie
- 2012 – Simon Curtis
- 2013 – Jacques Lafrance
- 2014 – Jacques Tremblay
- 2015 – Robert Stapleford
- 2016 – Dave Dickson
- 2017 – Sharon Giffen
- 2018 – John Dark
- 2019 – Marc Tardif
- 2020 – Michel St-Germain
- 2021 – Jacque Friedland
- 2022 – Hélène Pouliot
- 2023 – Steve Prince
- 2024 – Conrad Ferguson
- 2025 – Angelita Graham

== See also ==
- American Academy of Actuaries (United States)
- Casualty Actuarial Society (United States)
- Institute and Faculty of Actuaries (United Kingdom)
- International Actuarial Association
- Society of Actuaries (United States)
- Society of Actuaries in Ireland
