= FIAA =

FIAA may refer to:

- Federation of Indian Automobile Associations
- Fellow of the Institute of Actuaries of Australia
- Fellow of the Israel Association of Actuaries
- Florida Interscholastic Athletic Association
- Front Islamique Arabe de l'Azawad
- Furnishing Industry Association of Australia
- Future Instructors of America Association
- First In Adoption Act
- Foreign Illicit Assets Act (Switzerland)

Fiaa may refer to:

- an alternative spelling for Fih, Lebanon
