= SAV =

SAV may refer to:

- SAV Creation, designers of the 1995 Rollin video game
- SAV Studios, London, England, where Easy Cure recorded
- Spektrum Akademischer Verlag, a former German publisher later known as Springer Spektrum
- Stormartillerivagn m/43, a 1943 Swedish tank
- Schweizerische Aktuarvereinigung, the Swiss Association of Actuaries
- Slovenská akadémia vied, the Slovak academy of sciences
- Sozialistische Alternative, a German Trotskyist organisation
- Start of active video, in ITU-R BT.656 digital video
- Satisfaction approval voting

== Places ==
- Savannah/Hilton Head International Airport, IATA code
- Savannah (Amtrak station), Amtrak code
- Stratford-upon-Avon railway station code
- Savanna-la-Mar, Westmoreland parish, Jamaica

Sav may refer to:

- Sav Bhandari, a character in Degrassi: The Next Generation
- Sav Killz, a Wu-Tang Clan affiliate
- Sav Rocca (b1973), an Australian sportsman
- Önder Sav, a Turkish politician
- Sav., taxonomic author abbreviation of Ludovic Savatier (1830–1891), French naval doctor and botanist
- Salvador (Sav), a protein kinase in the Hippo signaling pathway
- .sav or .SAV, file extensions, often for saved states, including:
  - a Parallels Workstation saved state
  - MEM.SAV, in Atari DOS
  - a CorVision programming language file
  - an executable RT-11 file
- an abbreviation of save or saving:
  - Sav-A-Center, supermarkets, New Orleans, Louisiana metropolitan area, US
  - Sav-a-Lot, supermarkets
- A colloquial name for a saveloy sausage
- A slang abbreviation for "still a virgin" coined by Grammy-nominated rapper Jack Harlow in his song of the same title
