= NASCAR O'Reilly Auto Parts Series at Phoenix Raceway =

NASCAR O'Reilly Auto Parts Series race at Phoenix Raceway

NASCAR O'Reilly Auto Parts Series
- Venue: Phoenix Raceway
- Location: Avondale, Arizona, United States

Circuit information
- Surface: Asphalt
- Length: 1 mi (1.6 km)
- Turns: 4

Stock car races in the NASCAR O'Reilly Auto Parts Series has been held at Phoenix Raceway in Avondale, Arizona since 1999.

Both races are 200 laps and 200 miles (320 km) each.

== Spring race ==
GOVX 200
- First race: 2005
- Distance: 200 miles (320 km)
- Laps: 200; Stages 1/2: 45 each Final stage: 110
- Previous names: Bashas' Supermarkets 200 (2005–2012); Dollar General 200 Fueled by AmeriGas (2013); Blue Jeans Go Green 200 (2014); Axalta Faster. Tougher. Brighter 200 (2015–2016); DC Solar 200 (2017–2018) iK9 Service Dog 200 (2019); LS Tractor 200 (2020); Call 811 Before You Dig 200 (2021, 2024); United Rentals 200 (2022–2023)
- Most wins (driver): Kyle Busch (7)
- Most wins (team): Joe Gibbs Racing (11)
- Most wins (manufacturer): Toyota (11)

The GOVX 200 is a NASCAR O'Reilly Auto Parts Series stock car race held at Phoenix Raceway in Avondale, Arizona, held during the spring NASCAR weekend. Justin Allgaier is the defending winner of the event.

=== History ===
The spring race started in 2005, with Greg Biffle, winning the inaugural event. The race was titled the Basha's Supermarkets 200, the former name of the Fall race, until 2012.

Sponsors of the race included: Dollar General, Axalta, DC Solar, iK9 Service Dog, and LS Tractor.

In 2017, the event was one of the four Xfinity Dash4Cash events, taking Indianapolis Motor Speedway's spot and making the 2017 Dash4Cash events at Phoenix, Bristol, Richmond, and Dover. In 2018, the Dash4Cash event moved to the Ag-Pro 300 at Talladega.

On February 23, 2021, it was announced that Call811.com would sponsor the race. The next year on February 2, 2022, it was announced that United Rentals would be the title sponsor for the race.

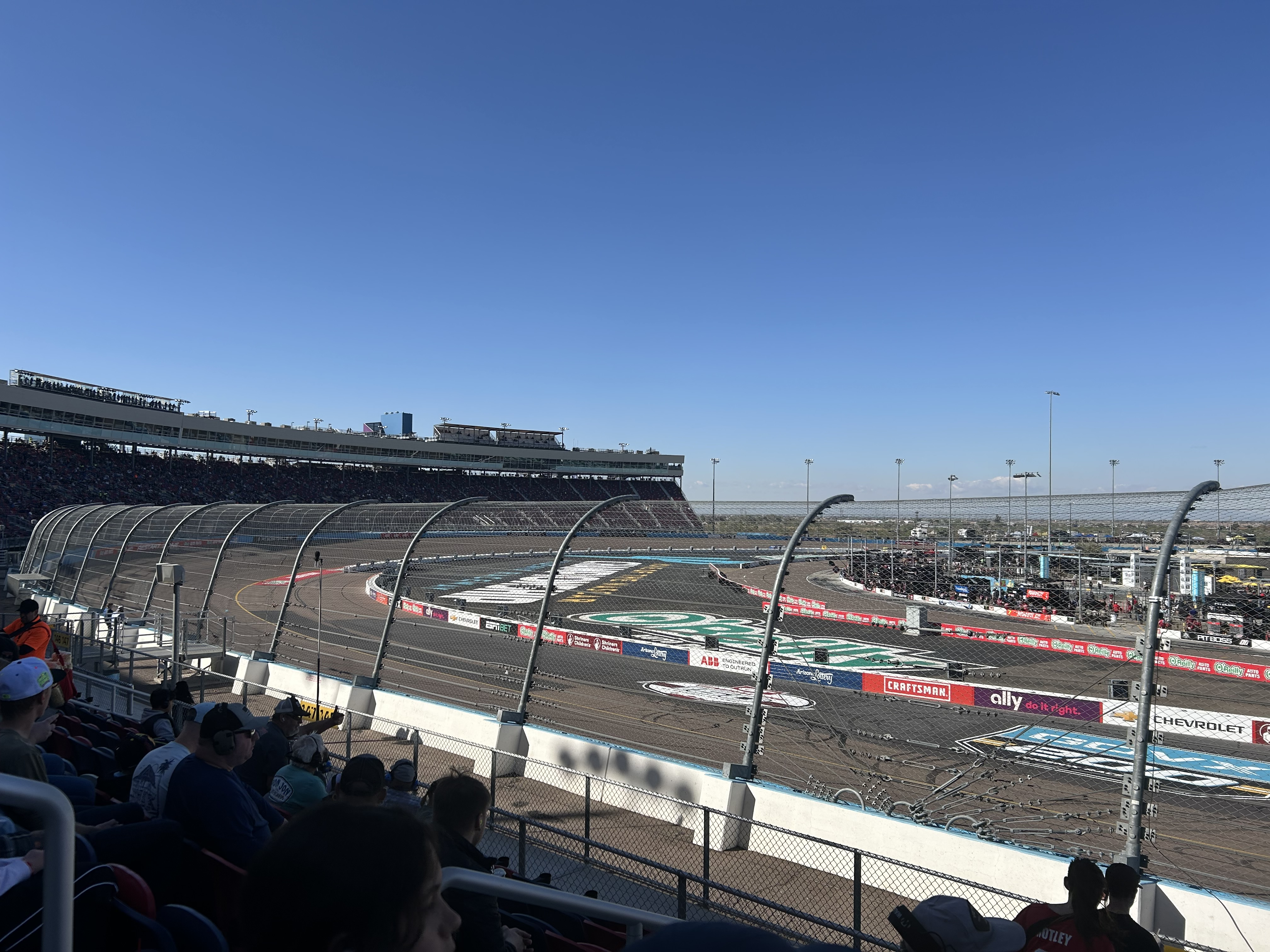
The 2025 GOVX 200

On February 20, 2024, it was announced that Call811.com would return as the sponsor for the race. On January 10, 2025 it was announced that GOVX would sponsor the race.

=== Past winners ===
Year	Date	No.	Driver	Team	Manufacturer	Race Distance		Race Time	Average Speed (mph)	Report	Ref
Year	Date	No.	Driver	Team	Manufacturer	Laps	Miles (km)	Race Time	Average Speed (mph)	Report	Ref
2005	April 22	66	Greg Biffle	Brewco Motorsports	Ford	200	200 (321.868)	2:24:34	83.007	Report	
2006	April 21	21	Kevin Harvick	Richard Childress Racing	Chevrolet	206*	206 (331.524)	2:13:59	92.25	Report	
2007	April 20	2	Clint Bowyer	Richard Childress Racing	Chevrolet	200	200 (321.868)	2:17:01	87.581	Report	
2008	April 11	18	Kyle Busch	Joe Gibbs Racing	Toyota	202*	202 (325.087)	2:02:43	98.764	Report	
2009	April 17	16	Greg Biffle	Roush Fenway Racing	Ford	203*	203 (326.696)	2:11:01	92.965	Report	
2010	April 9	18	Kyle Busch	Joe Gibbs Racing	Toyota	200	200 (321.868)	2:07:50	93.872	Report	
2011	February 26	18	Kyle Busch	Joe Gibbs Racing	Toyota	200	200 (321.868)	1:46:53	112.272	Report	
2012	March 3	2	Elliott Sadler	Richard Childress Racing	Chevrolet	200	200 (321.868)	1:43:10	116.317	Report	
2013	March 2	54	Kyle Busch	Joe Gibbs Racing	Toyota	200	200 (321.868)	2:04:45	96.192	Report	
2014	March 1	54	Kyle Busch	Joe Gibbs Racing	Toyota	168*	168 (270.37)	1:38:11	102.665	Report	
2015	March 14	22	Joey Logano	Team Penske	Ford	200	200 (321.868)	1:49:57	109.141	Report	
2016	March 12	18	Kyle Busch	Joe Gibbs Racing	Toyota	200	200 (321.868)	1:45:11	114.087	Report	
2017	March 18	7	Justin Allgaier	JR Motorsports	Chevrolet	200	200 (321.868)	2:11:51	91.013	Report	
2018	March 10	22	Brad Keselowski	Team Penske	Ford	200	200 (321.868)	1:56:29	103.019	Report	
2019	March 9	18	Kyle Busch	Joe Gibbs Racing	Toyota	200	200 (321.868)	1:59:30	100.897	Report	
2020	March 7	19	Brandon Jones	Joe Gibbs Racing	Toyota	200	200 (321.868)	2:09:47	92.462	Report	
2021	March 13	22	Austin Cindric	Team Penske	Ford	200	200 (321.868)	2:25:37	82.408	Report	
2022	March 12	9	Noah Gragson	JR Motorsports	Chevrolet	200	200 (321.868)	2:01:35	98.698	Report	
2023	March 11	18	Sammy Smith	Joe Gibbs Racing	Toyota	200	200 (321.868)	2:26:12	82.079	Report	
2024	March 9	81	Chandler Smith	Joe Gibbs Racing	Toyota	205*	205 (329.914)	2:12:57	92.516	Report	
2025	March 8	19	Aric Almirola	Joe Gibbs Racing	Toyota	208*	208 (334.742)	2:15:40	91.99	Report	
2026	March 7	7	Justin Allgaier	JR Motorsports	Chevrolet	200	200 (321.868)	2:07:47	93.909	Report	
2027	March 13									Report	

- 2006, 2008, 2009, 2024 and 2025: Races extended due to NASCAR overtime finishes.
- 2014: Race shortened due to rain.

==== Multiple winners (drivers) ====
# Wins	Driver	Years won
7	Kyle Busch	2008, 2010, 2011, 2013, 2014, 2016, 2019
2	Greg Biffle	2005, 2009
2	Justin Allgaier	2017, 2026

==== Multiple winners (teams) ====
# Wins	Team	Years won
11	Joe Gibbs Racing	2008, 2010, 2011, 2013, 2014, 2016, 2019, 2020, 2023–2025
3	Richard Childress Racing	2006, 2007, 2012
3	Team Penske	2015, 2018, 2021
3	JR Motorsports	2017, 2022, 2026

==== Manufacturer wins ====
# Wins	Make	Years won
11	(Japan) Toyota	2008, 2010, 2011, 2013, 2014, 2016, 2019, 2020, 2023–2025
6	(United States) Chevrolet	2006, 2007, 2012, 2017, 2022, 2026
5	(United States) Ford	2005, 2009, 2015, 2018, 2021

== Fall race ==
Timberland PRO 200
- Corporate sponsor: Timberland PRO
- First race: 1999
- Distance: 200 miles (320 km)
- Laps: 200; Stages 1/2: 45 each Final stage: 110
- Previous names: Outback Steakhouse 200 (1999–2001); Bashas' Supermarkets 200 (2002–2004); Arizona 200 (2005); Arizona.Travel 200 (2006–2007); Hefty Odor Block 200 (2008); Able Body Labor 200 (2009); Wypall* 200 Powered by Kimberly-Clark (2010); Wypall* 200 (2011); Great Clips 200 (2012); ServiceMaster 200 (2013); DAV 200 (2014–2015); Ticket Galaxy 200 (2016–2017); Whelen Trusted to Perform 200 (2018); Desert Diamond Casino West Valley 200 (2019–2020); NASCAR Xfinity Series Championship Race (2021–2025)
- Most wins (driver): Carl Edwards; Kyle Busch (4)
- Most wins (team): Roush Fenway Racing; Joe Gibbs Racing (7)
- Most wins (manufacturer): Ford (12)

The Timberland PRO 200 is a NASCAR O'Reilly Auto Parts Series stock car race held at Phoenix Raceway in Avondale, Arizona, held during the fall NASCAR weekend. Jesse Love is the defending winner of the event.

Since 2016, the race has been held at night and served as a round of the NASCAR O'Reilly Auto Parts Series Chase.

=== History ===
The race was first run in 1999 as the Outback Steakhouse 200. the race would be won by Jeff Gordon. It became the Bashas' Supermarkets 200 from 2002–2004. In 2005, Bashas' Supermarkets moved to the new Spring race and the November race would be titled the Arizona 200.

The race has had multiple sponsors including: Hefty, Able Body Labor, Wypall, Great Clips, ServiceMaster, DAV, Ticket Galaxy, Whelen Engineering Company, and Desert Diamond Casinos and Entertainment served as the title sponsor of the fall event.

It was the Championship Race from 2020 until 2025, when the race was moved back to Homestead–Miami Speedway. Timberland PRO became the sponsor of the race.

=== Past winners ===
Year	Date	No.	Driver	Team	Manufacturer	Race Distance		Race Time	Average Speed (mph)	Report	Ref
Year	Date	No.	Driver	Team	Manufacturer	Laps	Miles (km)	Race Time	Average Speed (mph)	Report	Ref
1999	November 6	24	Jeff Gordon	Gordon/Evernham Motorsports	Chevrolet	200	200 (321.868)	1:44:18	115.053	Report	
2000	November 4	9	Jeff Burton	Roush Racing	Ford	200	200 (321.868)	1:44:13	115.145	Report	
2001	October 27	60	Greg Biffle	Roush Racing	Ford	200	200 (321.868)	2:00:12	99.834	Report	
2002	November 9	23	Scott Wimmer	Bill Davis Racing	Pontiac	200	200 (321.868)	2:04:05	96.709	Report	
2003	November 1	25	Bobby Hamilton Jr.	Team Rensi Motorsports	Ford	181*	181 (291.291)	1:52:16	96.734	Report	
2004	November 6	41	Jamie McMurray	Chip Ganassi Racing	Dodge	205*	205 (329.915)	2:08:05	96.031	Report	
2005	November 12	60	Carl Edwards	Roush Racing	Ford	200	200 (321.868)	2:02:35	97.893	Report	
2006	November 11	17	Matt Kenseth	Roush Racing	Ford	203*	203 (326.696)	2:13:33	91.202	Report	
2007	November 10	5	Kyle Busch	Hendrick Motorsports	Chevrolet	203*	203 (326.696)	2:18:41	89.111	Report	
2008	November 8	60	Carl Edwards	Roush Fenway Racing	Ford	201*	201 (323.478)	2:06:27	95.374	Report	
2009	November 14	60	Carl Edwards	Roush Fenway Racing	Ford	200	200 (321.868)	1:59:03	100.798	Report	
2010	November 13	60	Carl Edwards	Roush Fenway Racing	Ford	200	200 (321.868)	1:52:05	107.063	Report	
2011	November 12	12	Sam Hornish Jr.	Penske Racing	Dodge	200	200 (321.868)	2:10:35	91.895	Report	
2012	November 10	18	Joey Logano	Joe Gibbs Racing	Toyota	204*	204 (328.306)	2:04:48	98.077	Report	
2013	November 9	54	Kyle Busch	Joe Gibbs Racing	Toyota	200	200 (321.868)	1:58:37	101.166	Report	
2014	November 8	22	Brad Keselowski	Team Penske	Ford	206*	206 (331.525)	2:00:30	102.573	Report	
2015	November 14	54	Kyle Busch	Joe Gibbs Racing	Toyota	200	200 (321.868)	1:45:39	113.583	Report	
2016	November 12	18	Kyle Busch	Joe Gibbs Racing	Toyota	200	200 (321.868)	2:03:19	97.31	Report	
2017	November 11	9	William Byron	JR Motorsports	Chevrolet	200	200 (321.868)	1:54:33	104.758	Report	
2018	November 10	20	Christopher Bell	Joe Gibbs Racing	Toyota	200	200 (321.868)	1:59:14	100.643	Report	
2019	November 9	7	Justin Allgaier	JR Motorsports	Chevrolet	200	200 (321.868)	1:52:13	106.936	Report	
2020	November 7	22	Austin Cindric	Team Penske	Ford	206*	206 (331.525)	2:13:51	92.342	Report	
2021	November 6	18	Daniel Hemric	Joe Gibbs Racing	Toyota	204*	204 (328.306)	2:22:35	85.845	Report	
2022	November 5	54	Ty Gibbs	Joe Gibbs Racing	Toyota	200	200 (321.868)	2:11:37	91.174	Report	
2023	November 4	00	Cole Custer	Stewart–Haas Racing	Ford	202*	202 (325.086)	2:13:53	90.527	Report	
2024	November 9	98	Riley Herbst	Stewart–Haas Racing	Ford	213*	213 (342.788)	2:24:20	88.545	Report	
2025	November 1	2	Jesse Love	Richard Childress Racing	Chevrolet	200	200 (321.868)	2:01:49	98.509	Report	
2026	October 17	2	Jesse Love	Richard Childress Racing	Chevrolet	200	200 (321.868)	2:04:31	96.373	Report	
2027	October 23									Report	

- 2003: Race shortened due to rain.
- 2004, 2006–2008, 2012, 2014, 2020, 2021, 2023 and 2024: Races extended due to a NASCAR overtime.
- 2020–2025: Races were held as the NASCAR O'Reilly Auto Parts Series Championship Race.

==== Multiple winners (drivers) ====
# Wins	Driver	Years won
4	Carl Edwards	2005, 2008–2010
4	Kyle Busch	2007, 2013, 2015, 2016
2	Jesse Love	2025, 2026

==== Multiple winners (teams) ====
# Wins	Team	Years won
7	Roush Fenway Racing	2000, 2001, 2005, 2006, 2008–2010
7	Joe Gibbs Racing	2012, 2013, 2015, 2016, 2018, 2021, 2022
3	Team Penske	2011, 2014, 2020
2	JR Motorsports	2017, 2019
2	Stewart–Haas Racing	2023, 2024
2	Richard Childress Racing	2025, 2026

==== Manufacturer wins ====
# Wins	Make	Years won
12	(United States) Ford	2000, 2001, 2003, 2005, 2006, 2008–2010, 2014, 2020, 2023, 2024
7	(Japan) Toyota	2012, 2013, 2015, 2016, 2018, 2021, 2022
6	(United States) Chevrolet	1999, 2007, 2017, 2019, 2025, 2026
2	(United States) Dodge	2004, 2011
1	(United States) Pontiac	2002

Previous race: Focused Health 250	NASCAR O'Reilly Auto Parts Series; GOVX 200	Next race: The LiUNA!

Previous race: Blue Cross NC 300	NASCAR O'Reilly Auto Parts Series; Timberland PRO 200	Next race: TPG 250
