= Croatian Actuarial Association =

Organization of Croatia

The Croatian Actuarial Association (CAA; Croatian: Hrvatsko aktuarsko društvo, HAD) is a professional association of actuaries in Croatia, promoting and developing actuary science and profession in theory and practice, facilitating members' professional development and knowledge sharing.

CAA has been established in 1996. with membership count of 131 regular, 42 affiliates and 2 honorary members.

CAA is a member of International Actuarial Association (IAA) and Actuarial Association of Europe (AAE).
