= Swedish Society of Actuaries =

Organization based in Sweden

The Swedish Society of Actuaries (Swedish: Svenska Aktuarieföreningen) is an association of actuaries in Sweden. The Society was founded on March 3, 1904. It is a full member of the International Actuarial Association and the Groupe Consultatif. As of 2004, the Society had about 290 members.
