= DAV =

DAV may refer to:

- DAV, a type of pulsating white dwarf
- Dav (journal) (1924-1937), a defunct leftist journal
- IATA code "DAV" for Enrique Malek International Airport, Chiriquí, Panama
- D.A.V. College Managing Committee, governing body of the Dayanand Anglo-Vedic College Trust and Management Society, an Indian educational society
  - DAV University, the flagship school of the DAV system, in Jalandhar, Punjab, India
- Democratic Association of Victoria, an Australian socialist organisation
- Deutsche Aktuarvereinigung (German Actuarial Society), German professional society
- Deutscher Alpenverein (German Alpine Club), a sports union in Germany
- Disabled American Veterans, an American veterans organization
- WebDAV (Web Distributed Authoring and Versioning), an extension of HTTP
- Diplomatic Academy of Vietnam
- DAV Racing, an Italian auto racing team

== People with the name ==
- Dav Pilkey (born 1966), American author and illustrator of children's literature
- Dav Whatmore (born 1954), Sri Lankan-born Australian cricketer and coach
