= Cyprus Association of Actuaries =

Organization of Cyprus

The Cyprus Association of Actuaries (CAA; Greek: Συνδεσμος Αναλογιστών Κύπρου) is the association of actuaries in Cyprus. The association was founded in 1991 and formally established in 1993. It is a full member of the International Actuarial Association and the Groupe Consultatif. As of 2009, the association has 48 fellows.
