= Alan Barrett =

Alan Barrett may refer to:

- Alan Barrett (economist), Irish economist
- Alan Barrett (rower) (1912–1961), British Olympic rower
- Alan Barrett (costume designer) (1938–1991), British costume designer nominated for the Academy Award for Costume Design
