= Royal Association of Belgian Actuaries =

Organization of Belgium

The Royal Association of Belgian Actuaries is the former name of the national association for actuaries in Belgium. It was known as the ARAB/KVBA, an acronym of its names in Dutch—Koninklijke Vereniging van Belgische Actuarissen—and French—L’Association Royale des Actuaires de Belgique. The association was founded in 1895, and was an original member of the International Actuarial Association, founded that same year. In 2009, the association changed its name to IA|BE, standing for Instituut van Actuarissen in België (in Dutch), Institut des Actuaires en Belgique (in French) and Institute of Actuaries in Belgium (in English).

== Objectives ==
The IA|BE aims to support and promote the profession of actuary. As a professional organisation, it aims to play a decisive role for its members in the communication of information on actuarial technical training and in the organisation of the profession. As such, the association wishes to develop its relations and complementarities with universities, the public sector, other professional associations and companies active in the same area.

In concert with their mission statement, the IA|BE is a member of both the Groupe Consultatif and the International Actuarial Association.
