= Toja =

Toja can refer to:

- one of the Uriankhai banners
- Guido Toja (1870–1933), Italian actuary
- Juan Carlos Toja (born 1985), Colombian footballer
- Toju Nakae (1608–1648), Japanese philosopher
