= Slovenian Association of Actuaries =

Organization of Slovenia

The Slovenian Association of Actuaries (Slovene: Slovensko aktuarsko društvo) is the association of actuaries in Slovenia. The association was founded on 30 January 1997. It is a full member of the International Actuarial Association and the Groupe Consultatif. As of 2007, the association has about 60 members, 37 of them fully qualified. The current chairman of the association is Darko Medved.
