= Danish Society of Actuaries =

Organization based in Denmark

The Danish Society of Actuaries (DSA; Danish: Danske Aktuarforening) is the association for actuaries in Denmark. The Society held its first constituents meeting on 23 April 1901 and the first meeting of members on 31 May 1901.

== Objectives ==
The objective of the Danish Society of Actuaries is to advance the body of knowledge of the actuarial science and to enhance the interest of the Danish actuary profession.

== International connections ==
The Danish Society of Actuaries is affiliated with the International Actuarial Association, of which all DSA members join, except for pensioners.

The Danish Society of Actuaries works together with the other societies of actuaries in the EC in Actuarial Association of Europe (AAE). One of the most important objectives of AAE is to keep in close contact with the European Commission and see to it that the Commission is aware of the standards of the societies.
