= Institute of Actuaries of France =

Organization of France

The Institute of Actuaries (French: Institut des Actuaires) is the association of actuaries in France. The institute was created in 2001 by a merger of the Institute of Actuaries of France and the French Federation of Actuaries. The institute is a full member of the International Actuarial Association and the Groupe Consultatif. As of 2012, it has about 3 000 full members. Current president of the institute is Thomas Behar.

In France the education of future actuaries will be facilitated by the national education system. The actuarial profession in France, in itself, has no such responsibility any more. But accrediting the diplomas awarded to the future actuaries is the responsibility of the French actuarial profession. Note that, these diplomas which accredited by French have access to the actuarial body.
