= Hungarian Actuarial Society =

Organization of Hungary

The Hungarian Actuarial Society was founded in 1991 to represent actuaries in Hungary. As of 2004, it has about 140 members, 80 of which are qualified (full) members. It is a full member of the International Actuarial Association and the Groupe Consultatif.
