= Actuarial Society of Finland =

Organization based in Finland

The Actuarial Society of Finland (Finnish: Suomen Aktuaariyhdistys) is the association of actuaries in Finland. The Society was founded on 21 April 1922. It is a full member of the International Actuarial Association and the Groupe Consultatif. The Society has about 300 members.
