= Actuarial Society of the Netherlands =

Organization of the Netherlands

Founded in 1888, the Actuarial Society (Dutch: Actuarieel Genootschap, AG ), is the professional association of actuaries in the Netherlands. Nearly all Dutch actuaries are members.

== Composition ==
The Actuarial Society has five sections:

1. ASLI (Actuarial Studies in Life Insurance)
2. ASTIN (Actuarial Studies in Non-Life Insurance)
3. ASIP (Actuarial Studies in Pensions)
4. AFIR (Actuarial Approach for Financial Risks)
5. KAA (Kring van Actuarieel Analisten)

== Mission statement ==
The objective of the Actuarial Society is, on the one hand, to make the actuarial profession better known and appreciated (among other means by research and publications, co-operation with other organisations, internationalisation, evolution and regulation of the profession), and on the other to educate and train actuaries in terms of quality and integrity (through education and quality control, seminars and meetings).

== Membership ==
Eligible for the membership of the AG are fully qualified actuaries who have acquired the Actuary Certificate of the Actuarial Institute and those who work in the Netherlands as members of foreign sister associations with which the AG has concluded an admission agreement. Members of the AG are authorised to use the title of AG Actuary (AAG). Besides members, the AG recognises affiliate members. Full members automatically join the worldwide association of actuaries—the International Actuarial Association—and the European organisation, the Groupe Consultatif.
