= Estonian Actuarial Society =

Organization based in Estonia

The Estonian Actuarial Society (EAL; Estonian: Eesti Aktuaaride Liit) is the association of actuaries in Estonia. The Society was established on 5 January 1999. It is a full member of the International Actuarial Association and the Groupe Consultatif. As of 2004, the Society has 23 members, 7 of them fully qualified.

== Chairperson ==
- 2005-2008 Jaanus Sibul
- 2008-2011 Marika Guralnik
