= Swiss Association of Actuaries =

Swiss actuarial association

The Swiss Association of Actuaries (SAA, German: Schweizerische Aktuarvereinigung, SAV, French: Association Suisse des Actuaires, ASA) is the association of actuaries in Switzerland. The association was established in 1905. It is a full member of the International Actuarial Association and the Actuarial Association of Europe. As of 2017 (June), the association has 1 364 members, 778 of them fully qualified. Current president of the association is Klemens Binswanger.

All persons exercising the profession of pension actuaries in Switzerland are required to pursue continuing professional development (CPD) and record all their CPD activities with the Swiss Association of Actuaries.
