= Slovak Society of Actuaries =

Organization of Slovakia

The Slovak Society of Actuaries (SSA; Slovak: Slovenská spoločnosť aktuárov) is the association of actuaries in Slovakia. The Society was established in 1996. It is a full member of the International Actuarial Association and the Groupe Consultatif. As of 2011, the Society has about 150 members, 25 of them fully qualified. Current chairman of the Society is Jozef Zelina.

== History ==
The Slovak Society of Actuaries was established in 1996. It aims to develop actuarial science in Slovakia and to promote actuaries within the local financial market.

The Society represents Slovak actuaries in international actuarial bodies. In 2005, it became a full member of the International Actuarial Association and also a full member of the Groupe Consultatif.

== Past chairperson ==
- 2001-2006 Mária Bilíková
- 2006-2010 Jelica Kľúčovská
- 2010-2012 Mária Kamenárová
- 2012-2014 Jozef Hančár
- 2014-2016 Mária Kamenárová
- 2016-2021 Jozef Ducký
- 2021-2024 Mária Kamenárová
- since 2024 Jozef Zelina
