= Guido Toja =

Italian mathematician (1870–1933)

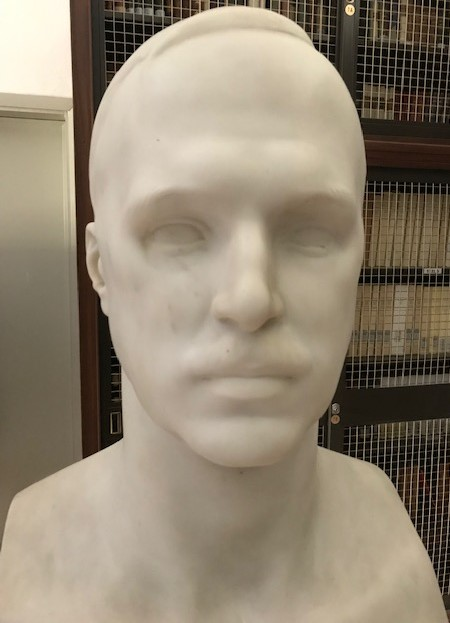
Guido Toja

Guido Toja (25 April 1870, Florence – 25 February 1933, Rome) was an Italian actuary and president of the Istituto Italiano delle Assicurazioni.

Toja received his laurea in engineering from the Sapienza University of Rome. He started his career in insurance as an actuary for Fondiaria Vita, then the largest Italian life insurance company. He taught financial mathematics at Bocconi University in Milan. He then held important positions in the Italian insurance field, notably the presidency of the Istituto Italiano delle Assicurazioni. As president, Toja commissioned Ugo Giovannozzi as the architect for the new headquarters of the Istituto Nazionale delle Assicurazioni in Rome. Toja was dismissed in 1925 from the presidency for political reasons even though he was more pro-fascist than anti-fascist; the problem was that a publication of the Istituto gave a too objective description (from an anonymous author signed "T.") of the political kidnapping and assassination of Matteotti in 1924.

Toja was a professor ordinarius of financial mathematics in the Regio Istituto Superiore di Scienze Economiche e Commerciali di Firenze, where a bust of him is now kept. Upon his death he willed his private library to the University of Florence, which also keeps a bust of him.

He participated in 1895 in the first International Congress of Actuaries and in several subsequent congresses. He was an Invited Speaker of the ICM in 1908 in Rome.
