= Actuarial Association of Austria =

Organization of Austria

The Austrian Actuarial Society (German: Aktuarvereinigung Österreichs, AVÖ) is the association of actuaries in Austria. The Society was established in 1971. It is a full member of the International Actuarial Association and the Groupe Consultatif. The Society has more than 500 members, 367 of them fully qualified. Current president of the Society is Hartwig Sorger (since 26 June 2020.

== Past presidents ==
- Heimo Nabl (1971–1985)
- Ernst Kompast (1986 to 8 April 1992)
- Eduard Wimmer (8 April 1992 to 31 December 1998)
- Helmut Holzer (1 January 1999 to 12 May 2005)
- Klaus Wegenkittl (12 May 2005 to 14 May 2008)
- Christoph Krischanitz (14 May 2008 to 12 June 2014)
- Manfred Rapf (12 June 2014 to 26 June 2020)
