= Serbian Association of Actuaries =

Organization of Serbia

The Serbian Association of Actuaries (SAA; Serbian: Udruženje aktuara Srbije) is the association of actuaries in Serbia. The society was founded in 2002 and it is a full member of the International Actuarial Association. As of 2012, the association has 40 fully qualified members. Current president of the association is Branko Pavlović.

== Past presidents ==
- 2002-2012 Jelena Kočović
- Since 2012 Branko Pavlović
