= Vladimír Mandl =

Czech lawyer and university lecturer (1899–1941)

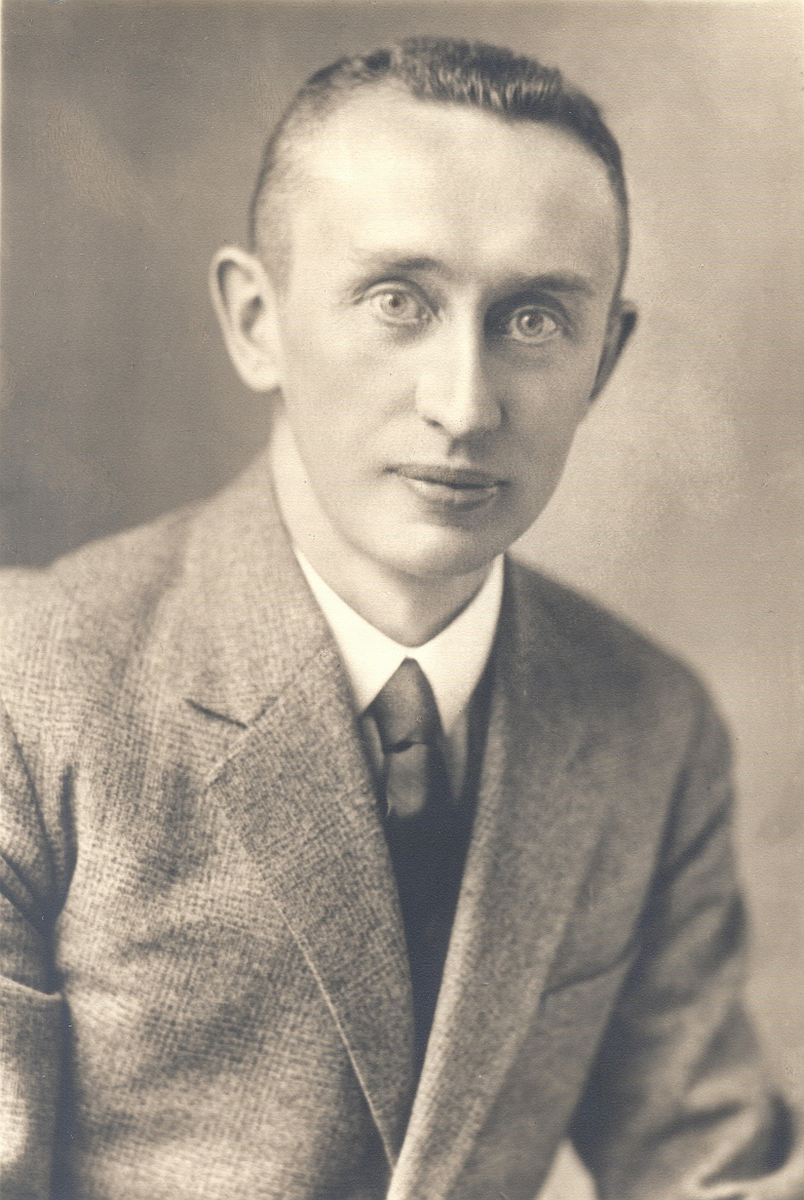
- Born: 20 March 1899; Plzeň, Bohemia Austria-Hungary
- Died: 8 January 1941 (aged 41); Nová Ves pod Pleší, Protectorate of Bohemia and Moravia
- Burial place: Central Cemetery, Plzeň
- Education: Charles University
- Children: 2 (including Petr)
- Father: Matouš Mandl
- Relatives: Josef Mandl (uncle)

Vladimír Mandl (20 March 1899 – 8 January 1941) was a Czech lawyer and university lecturer. In 1932, he authored Das Weltraum-Recht: Ein Problem der Raumfahrt (Space Law: A Problem of Space Travel), the first stand-alone treatise on space law, which preceded the launch of Sputnik 1 by 25 years. For this work, some scholars consider him as the "father of space law".

Born in Plzeň in Bohemia, then part of Austria-Hungary, Mandl studied law in Prague and Erlangen–Nuremberg. He practised as a lawyer from the 1920s and taught law at the Czech Technical University, until all Czech universities were closed following the Nazi occupation of Czechoslovakia in 1939. According to research by Michal Plavec of the National Technical Museum in Prague, Mandl held strong antisemitic views and published antisemitic articles in the nationalist newspaper Venkov from December 1938, though no evidence of collaboration with Nazi Germany has been found.

Mandl published on a wide range of legal topics in Czech, German, French and English, with a particular focus on private law, transportation law and aviation law. He died of tuberculosis on 8 January 1941, aged 41.

== Life ==
=== Early life and education ===
Vladimír Mandl was born on 20 March 1899 in Plzeň in Bohemia, then part of Austria-Hungary. He was the son of Matouš Mandl, who later became the mayor of Plzeň (1917–1919), and Růžena Mandlová née Čiperová. He was one of three siblings, but his brother Matouš Mandl died shortly after birth. His uncle was the painter Josef Mandl. Before Mandl reached his fourteenth birthday, he is said to have built his first Blériot-type monoplane thus showing a keen interest in modern transportation from an early age.

After his high school education, Mandl entered the Faculty of Law of the Charles University in Prague. There he studied under Václav Hora, an expert on civil procedure, and graduated on 24 November 1921 with a doctorate in law.

=== Lawyer and author on legal topics ===
After his graduation, Mandl practised law from 1921 to 1927 in the law office of Antonín Schauer in Prague and his father's law office in Plzeň. After completing his bar exam, he opened his own law office on 1 March 1927.

Following graduation, Mandl became a prolific writer on a range of legal topics, with a particular focus on private law issues and the legal aspects of technological innovations. In 1925, he authored a paper on evidence for the congress of Czechoslovak lawyers and in 1926, he penned a self-published monograph on Czechoslovak marriage law. He then turned to transportation law and first wrote a treatise on aviation law, published by the Západočeský aeroklub (the West Bohemia Aeroclub) in 1928, and then in 1929, a tome on the Automobile Act of 9 August 1908 and its reform. His work on aviation law was the first work on this area of law in Czech and dealt with a variety of topics ranging from air transportation contracts to aerial warfare. It was awarded the state prize of the Czechoslovak Ministry of Justice in 1928.

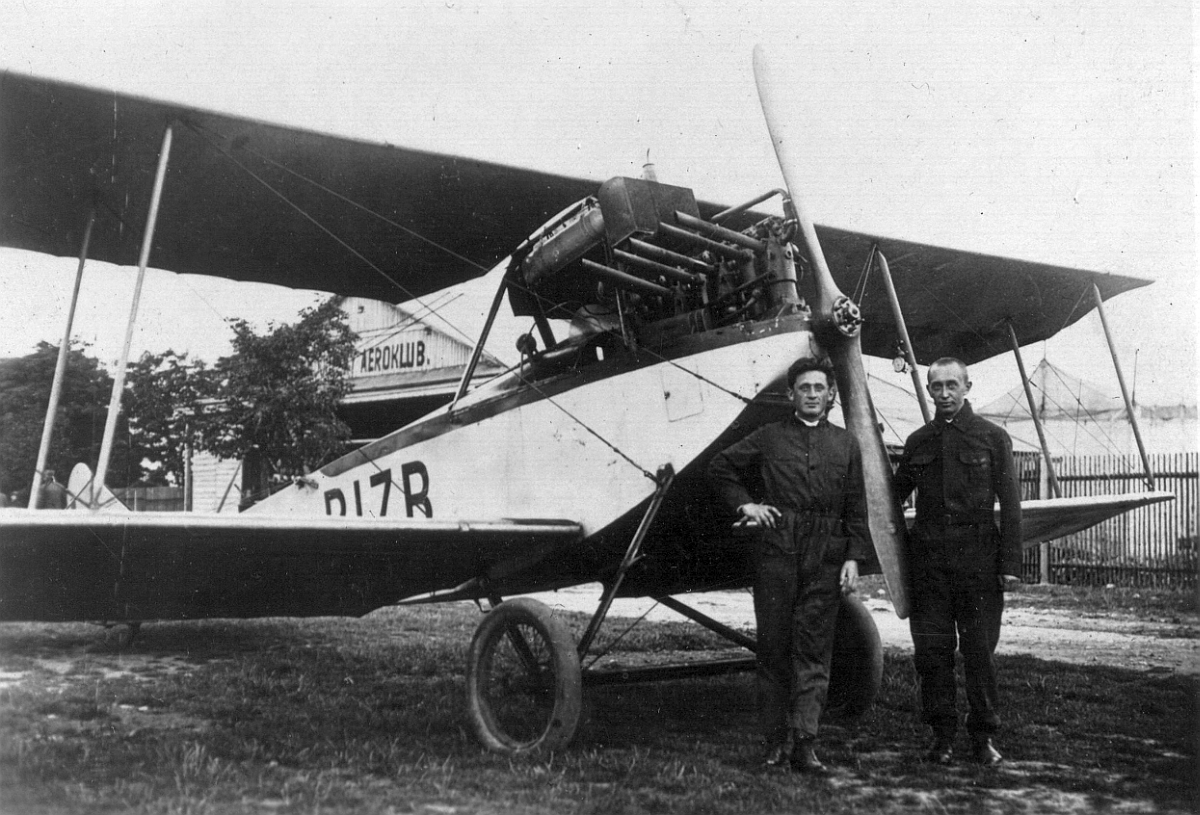
Vladimír Mandl (pictured right) as an aviator of the West Bohemian Aeroclub (pictured right) c. 1929, when he obtained his pilot's licence

In 1929, Mandl turned his legal interests into practice and obtained a private pilot licence. Mandl continued his writings on the law of aviation and published his first book in German in the same year; it dealt with the Czechoslovak law of aviation.

=== Privatdozent ===
Probably to focus more on his scholarly interests, Mandl pursued an academic career from the late 1920s onwards. To obtain a Habilitation, a necessity for a professorship, he submitted his 1928 work on aviation law as a Habilitation thesis to the Czech Technical University in Prague. His thesis was unanimously approved and his test lecture on the liability of contractors for damage was held successfully on 30 April 1930; the Czechoslovak minister of education then confirmed him (Note: Decree of 30 September 1932 (No. 892 12/31-IV/3).) as a Privatdozent on 30 September 1932 with a venia legendi for the law of industrial enterprises.

Concurrently, Mandl successfully obtained a German doctorate in law: He received his PhD on 20 June 1931 from the University of Erlangen–Nuremberg with a dissertation on tort law titled Zivilistischer Aufbau des Schadenersatzrechtes (Civilian Construction of Tort Law).

During this time Mandl continued to publish new works: For example, in 1932 he authored a work on the 1919 Paris Convention in Czech and in 1935, he published an article on the parachute in French.

=== Spaceflight and space law ===
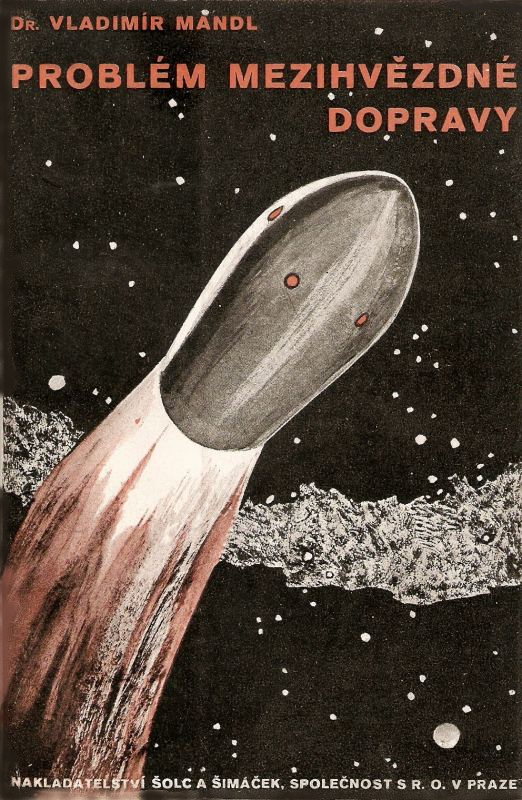
The cover of Mandl's 1932 work Problem mezihvězdné dopravy (The Problem of Interstellar Transport)

Mandl had a keen interest in the possibility of spaceflight, in which he firmly believed, and from the 1930s began to publish in this area as well: In 1932, he published a work in Czech on the problem of interstellar transport. It dealt, inter alia, with the works of Konstantin Tsiolkovski, Robert H. Goddard, Franz von Hoefft and Hermann Oberth on rocketry and contained a description of Mandl's own patent for a rocket, (Note: Czechoslovak Patent No 52236, class 46d, granted in on 25 September 1933.) which was granted in Czechoslovakia in 1933. There is no evidence that the patented rocket was ever constructed.

He then turned to his pioneer work on space law: 25 years before Sputnik 1, the first artificial Earth satellite, was launched into space in October 1957, he contemplated the legal issues which would arise out of spaceflight in his 50-page book Das Weltraum-Recht: Ein Problem der Raumfahrt (Space Law: A Problem of Space Travel) written in German. To find a publisher for this work proved difficult: In Czechoslovakia, Mandl did not find one and his German publisher only agreed to publish it at his own cost. Only twenty-five copies of the work were eventually sold, but this monograph is now remembered – and praised – as the first stand-alone volume on space law.

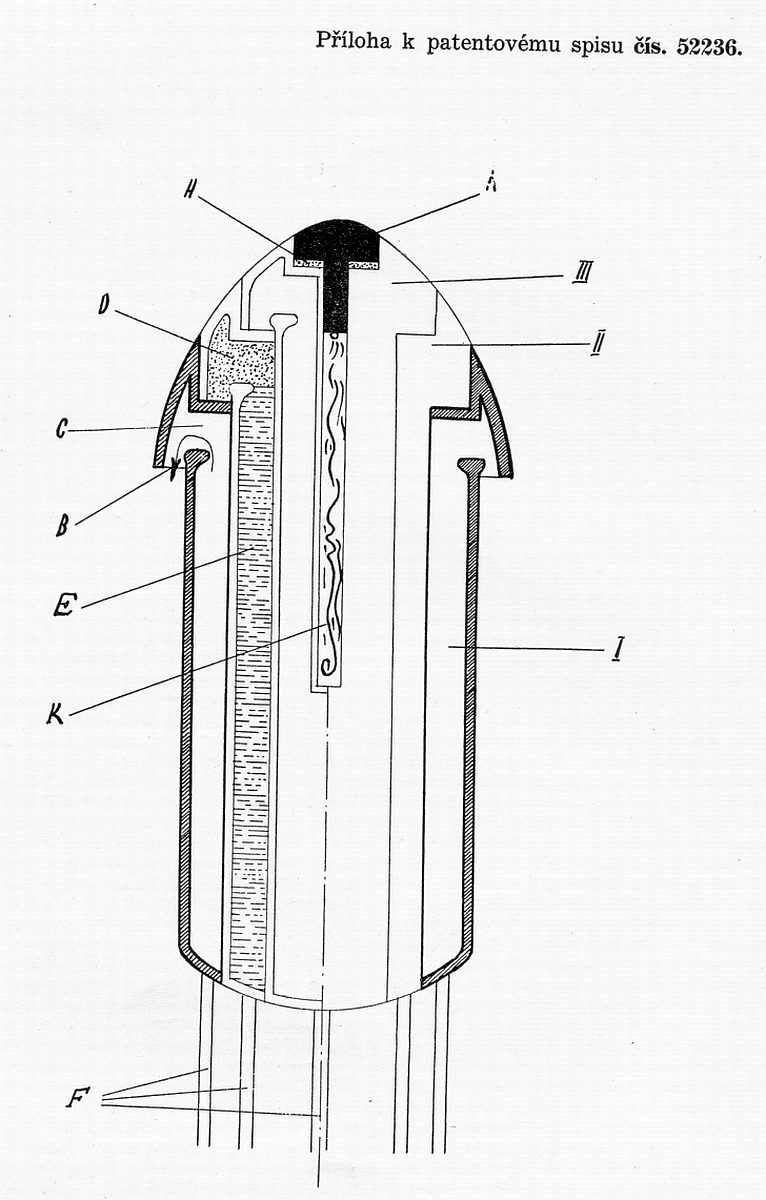
Mandl's Patent No. 52236, class 46d, granted on 25 September 1933

The work is separated into two parts: The present (Die Gegenwart) and the future (Die Zukunft). In the first part Mandl discusses how air law could be applied by analogy to space. In this part he deals with overflight rights over real property, he strongly argues for the application of strict liability, and he considers the sovereignty of states over their airspace.

In his speculations about future developments, he foresees the legislators becoming active in this field of law and argues for licencing of space flights and the application of strict liability. Going further, Mandl discusses the future exploitation of raw materials in space and argues that the sovereignty of states over their airspace will end at the point where space begins; in space no sovereignty exists according to Mandl (caelum liberum). The final passage of Mandl's considerations on the future discusses the implications of regular spaceflight and the colonization of new worlds on statehood and national sovereignty. According to Mandl, many humans would opt to live on new worlds. In these newly settled worlds, no state could use methods of legal compulsion and citizens could escape legal consequences on earth by going to these celestial bodies. Mandl thinks that this will result in a new private society (Privatgesellschaft), where state and citizens are equal, and no method of state sovereignty will be left to compel the individual – essentially resulting in the breakdown of modern notions of statehood and law.

Es ist unschwer einzusehen, daß es nicht möglich sein wird, den juristischen Staats- und Rechtsbegriff von heute aufrechtzuerhalten, sobald die Erschließung des Weltraumes den Erdbewohnern neue hoheitlose Gegenden eröffnet, und daß daher der Aufschwung der Raumfahrt zugleich eine neue Epoche in der Geschichte jener beiden Begriffe – des Staates und des Rechts – bedeuten wird.

It is easy to see that it will not be possible to maintain today's legal concepts of state and law as soon as the opening up of outer space provides new areas without sovereignty for the inhabitants of earth, and that therefore the upswing of space travel will at the same time signify a new epoch in the history of those two concepts – of state and of law.

— Vladimír Mandl, Das Weltraum-Recht (Space Law)

=== Later work, university lecturing and antisemitism ===
After his work on space and its law, Mandl again focused on private law and adjacent fields: In 1936, he published a short work on legal theory titled Eine kausale Rechtstheorie (A Causal Theory of Law) in German. And in 1938, on the eve of World War II, Mandl self-published a work titled Válka a mír (War and Peace).

Concurrently with his publications, Mandl taught at the Czech Technical University in Prague as an associate professor. He began teaching a course on the law of industrial enterprises in the academic year 1933–1934 and kept teaching through the academic year 1938–1939. After the Nazi occupation of Czechoslovakia all Czech universities were, however, closed in November 1939 and he accordingly had to cease his academic work.

According to research by Michal Plavec of the National Technical Museum, Mandl held strong antisemitic views. He started publishing antisemitic articles after the Munich Crisis in the nationalist newspaper Venkov from December 1938. For collaboration with Nazi Germany, there is, however, no evidence.

=== Illness and death ===
Mandl contracted tuberculosis and stayed in a sanatorium in Nová Ves pod Pleší (near Příbram) in 1940. He died of the disease aged 41 on 8 January 1941 and was buried in his family's tomb at the Central Cemetery in Plzeň.

== Family ==
Mandl married Bohumila Mandlová née Charvátová (born 5 April 1907) on 2 July 1930 in Plzeň. They had two children, Markéta and Petr. Petr, born on 5 November 1933, became a renowned mathematician.

== Reception of his work on space law ==
=== Contemporaneous views ===
Contemporaneously, Mandl's 1932 treatise on space law was received sceptically. The legal scholar – and later member of the German resistance – Rüdiger Schleicher remarked in a 1933 review of the work in the Archiv der civilistischen Praxis, an important German law journal, positively on the quality of the legal arguments but was of the strong opinion that hypothetical legal issues which had not yet arisen and were not likely to arise in the foreseeable future should not be discussed by legal scholars.

Alles Recht ist in irgendeiner Weise Ordnung menschlicher Interessen, Lösung von Interessengegensätzen. Sind solche noch gar nicht sichtbar [...], so darf sich der Jurist als solcher mit ihnen nicht befassen [...]. Es erscheint mir daher unzulässig, wenn – wie es hier geschieht – im einzelnen geprüft wird, ob auf Raumfahrzeuge z. B. die Bestimmungen des Luftverkehrsgesetzes über das Überflugs- und Landungsrecht oder die Gefährdungshaftung entsprechend angewandt werden dürfen. Nicht die Form der juristischen Monographie ist hier am Platze, sondern höchstens die des Staatsromans, der Utopia des Thomas Morus.

All law is in some way an ordering of human interests, a solution of conflicting interests. If such conflicts are not yet visible [...], the jurist as such may not deal with them [...]. Therefore, it seems inadmissible to me if – as it is done here – it is examined in detail whether the provisions of the Air Traffic Act concerning the right of overflight and landing apply or whether strict liability may be applied to space vehicles analogously. The form of the legal monograph is not appropriate here, but at most that of the state novel, the Utopia of Thomas Morus.

— Rüdiger Schleicher

=== Modern assessment ===
In modern times Mandl's 1932 publication has been received much more positively: Stephan Hobe, a German space law scholar, has argued that Mandl's pleading "for new rules […], for a regime of strict liability, jurisdiction in outer space, and for nationality" was "all based on the assessment of outer space being legally different from the sovereignty-based system of the airspace". Hobe thus considered Mandl's work to be "a remarkable achievement in the year 1932". Vladimír Kopal and Mahulena Hofmann opined that Mandl has "entered the history of astronautics and particularly that of space law" with his work, while others go further and consider him to be the "father" or the "founding father of space law".

== Published works ==
A bibliography of his major published works is provided by Vladimír Kopal and Mahulena Hofmann.

- Mandl, Vladimír (1925). Jakým způsobem bylo by upraviti předpisy o důkazu slyšením stran, zejména se zřetelem k odchylným předpisům rakouského i uherského soudního řádu? [How should the Rules on Evidence by Hearing the Parties be formulated, especially in View of the Different rules of the Austrian and Hungarian Rules of Court?] (in Czech). 2. sjezd čsl. právníků. OCLC 85638110.
- Mandl, Vladimír (1926). Manželské procesní právo československé: studie [Czechoslovak Matrimonial Procedural Law: a Study] (in Czech). Plzeň. OCLC 85388226.
- Mandl, Vladimír (1928). Letecké právo [Air Law] (in Czech). Západočeský aeroklub. OCLC 85288763.
- Mandl, Vladimír (1929). Automobilovy zakon z 9.srpna 1908 a jeho reforma [Automobile Act of 9 August 1908 and its Reform]. Sbírka spisu právnických a národo hospodářských (in Czech). Vol. 41. Barvič. OCLC 35400976.
- Mandl, Vladimír (1929). Das tschechoslowakische Luftverkehrs-Gesetz (Gesetz betreffend den Luftverkehr) vom 8. Juli 1925. Sammlung der Gesetze und Verordnungen Nr. 172. Erläutert von Vladimír Mandl [The Czechoslovak Air Traffic Act of 8 July 1925. Collection of Laws and Ordinances No. 172. Explained by Vladimír Mandl.]. Stiepels Gesetz-Sammlung des tschechoslowakischen Staates (in German). Vol. 53. Reichenberg: Verlag von Gebrüder Stiepel. OCLC 43593138.
- Mandl, Vladimír (1932a). Zivilistischer Aufbau des Schadenersatzrechtes: Ein rechtstheoretischer Versuch [Civilian Structure of Tort Law: A Legal Theory Attempt] (in German). Wrocław: M. & H. Marcus. OCLC 25520593.
- Mandl, Vladimír (1932b). Das Weltraum-Recht: Ein Problem der Raumfahrt [Space Law: A Problem of Space Travel] (PDF) (in German). Mannheim; Berlin; Leipzig: J. Bensheimer. OCLC 72241352.
  - English translation: Outer Space Law: A Problem of Astronautics (PDF). Translated by Leo Kanner Associates. NASA. December 1984.
- Mandl, Vladimír (1932c). Problém mezihvězdné dopravy [The Problem of Interstellar Transport] (in Czech). Prague: Nakladatelstvǐ Šolc a Šimáček. OCLC 6880655.
- Mandl, Vladimír (1934). Eingetragener Verein Fortschrittliche Verkehrstechnik (ed.). Die Rakete zur Höhenforschung: Ein Beitrag zum Raumfahrtproblem [The Rocket for the Exploration of Great Heights – A Contribution to the Problem of Spaceflight] (in German). Leipzig; Berlin: Hachmeister & Thal. OCLC 29768328.
- Mandl, Vladimír (1935). "Le parachute". Revue générale de droit aérien (in French) (2–4). ISSN 1245-5644.
- Mandl, Vladimír (1936). Eine kausale Rechtstheorie [A Causal Theory of Law]. Rechtswissenschaftliche Studien (in German). Vol. 60. Berlin: Emil Ebering. OCLC 18917944.
- Mandl, Vladimír (1936). Essays of a European Technocrat. Wetzel Publishing. OCLC 613120097.
- Mandl, Vladimír (1938). Válka a mír [War and Peace] (in Czech). Prague. OCLC 85610096.
