= Actuarial Society of Hong Kong =

Organization of Hong Kong, China

The Actuarial Society of Hong Kong (香港精算學會)
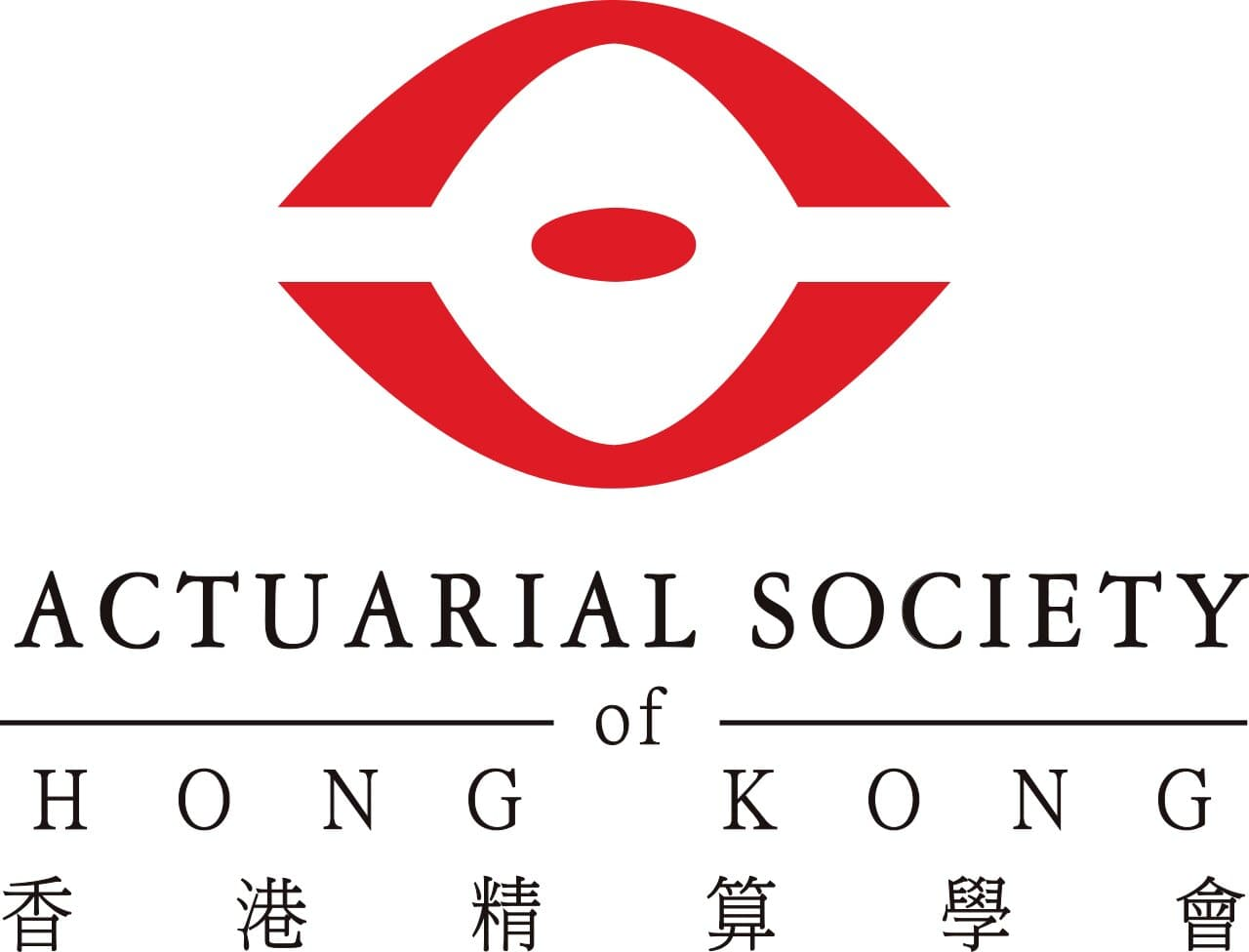
- Actuarial Society of Hong Kong
- Abbreviation: ASHK
- Predecessor: Actuarial Association of Hong Kong
- Formation: 1968
- Incorporated: 1994
- Office: Admiralty, Hong Kong
- Membership: Approx. 1,600 (December 2025)
- President: Mark Saunders
- Vice-president: Patrick Au
- Immediate Past President: Steve Hui
- Publication: Actuzine (精誌)
- Website: https://www.actuaries.org.hk/

The Actuarial Society of Hong Kong (ASHK; Chinese: 香港精算學會) is the professional actuarial body of Hong Kong. It is governed by an elected council of 15 members, including a president and a vice-president. The organization was accepted as a fully accredited member of the International Actuarial Association (IAA) in 2000.

Being a Fellow Member of the ASHK is a statutory requirement under the Insurance (Actuaries’ Qualifications) Regulations (Cap. 41A) to practice as an Appointed Actuary or Certifying Actuary in Hong Kong.

== History ==
The predecessor of the ASHK was the Actuarial Association of Hong Kong (AAHK), which was founded in 1968. According to the society's historical records, the concept for the association was conceived in 1967 by the only two qualified actuaries in Hong Kong at the time (Kevin Claridge and F. W. Stephens) alongside their associates and officials from the Government Census & Statistics Department. When the AAHK was founded in 1968, five founding members (Kevin Claridge, F. W. Stephens, Edmund Tse, Y. K. Chan, and Benjamin Mok) served as the provisional committee, and the association recorded twelve members during its first year.

The organization was initially established to create a forum for actuaries to discuss topics of common interest to them as professionals. In 1972, Peter Luk became the first locally trained actuary and Fellow of the Institute of Actuaries (FIA) in the United Kingdom, and Che Lam was made a Fellow of the Society of Actuaries of the United States of America. Three more individuals attained fellowship by the late 1970s.

In 1994, the AAHK was succeeded by the ASHK when the society was incorporated as the actuarial professional body in Hong Kong, representing professionals from the insurance, finance and investment industries, government bodies and educational institutions.

Between December 1994 and May 1995, the society navigated a major dispute when 24 members, comprising approximately 10 percent of the total membership, tendered their resignations. This concerted action was driven by three main reasons: grievances that their views on various insurance issues were not heard by the government (which was sparked by the outcome of consultations on solvency margins and minimum valuation bases for life insurers), the society's lack of professional status, and its perceived inefficiency. The dispute was resolved in mid-1995 following formal negotiations with the government regarding life insurance solvency margin calculations, which led to a government proposal for the society to draft an official industry guidance note on the matter, and resulted in the widespread reinstatement of the resigned members.

With the historical grievances no longer applicable, the ASHK's professional standing was subsequently recognized within the regulatory framework. Being a Fellow Member of the ASHK is now a statutory requirement under the Insurance (Actuaries’ Qualifications) Regulations (Cap. 41A) to practice as an Appointed Actuary or Certifying Actuary in Hong Kong.

== Membership ==
As of December 2025, the ASHK has approximately 1,600 active members. There are five classes of membership: Fellow Members, Chartered Members, Associate Members, Student Members, and Honorary Members.

=== Fellow Members ===
A Fellow Member of the ASHK (with the credential FASHK) is a fellow member of an international actuarial body approved by the council, having appropriate professional actuarial qualifications and practical experience, and have passed two specified papers of the ASHK Certificate (Certificate in Hong Kong Insurance Markets and Regulations) (or equivalent). Being a Fellow Member of the ASHK is a requirement (Insurance [Actuaries’ Qualifications] Regulations Cap. 41A) for an Appointed Actuary / Certifying Actuary in Hong Kong.

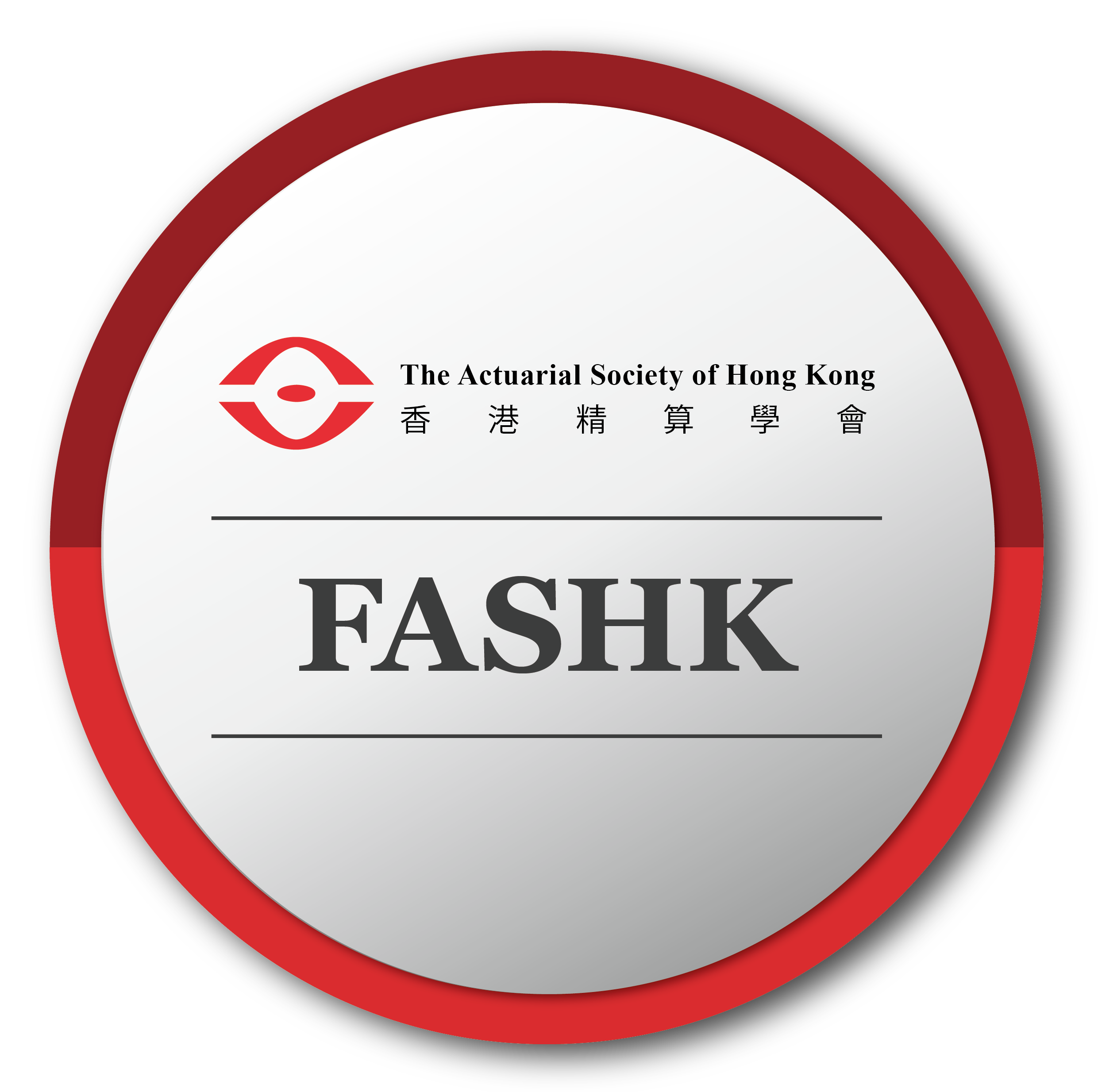
FASHK badge

Fellow Members are entitled to use the FASHK designation. The FASHK mark has been registered with the Trade Marks Registry of the Intellectual Property Department since February 2020. All FASHK in good standing are issued a digital FASHK badge.

=== Chartered Members ===
In 2026, the ASHK introduced a new membership class called Chartered Members. A Chartered Member of the ASHK (with the credential CASHK) is a fellow member of an international actuarial body approved by the council, having appropriate professional actuarial qualifications and practical experience, and have not passed the two specified papers of the ASHK Certificate (Certificate in Hong Kong Insurance Markets and Regulations) (or equivalent). Chartered Members are generally entitled to exercise the full rights of a Member. Chartered Members are entitled to use the CASHK designation.

=== Associate Members ===
An Associate Member of the ASHK is an associate member of an international actuarial body approved by the council, having appropriate professional actuarial qualifications and practical experience.

=== Student Members ===
Persons who have not yet achieved an associate level from any actuarial body may apply to be a Student Member of the ASHK, without voting rights. Members taking student membership are further classified into Ordinary Student Members and University Student Members.

=== Honorary Members ===
Honorary Membership is conferred via member nomination to the council and approval at the annual general meeting (AGM) for significant contributions to the profession. As of March 2026, the active Honorary Members are Yim Kwong Chan, Stuart H. Leckie, Patrick Poon, and Edmund Tse.

== Regulatory and professional activities ==
=== Contribution to regulatory frameworks ===
The ASHK acts as the consultative professional body representing the actuarial profession working with the Insurance Authority (IA), which is the insurance regulator in Hong Kong, to establish and revise actuarial guidelines and domestic standard frameworks. Beyond its advisory role to the IA, the society also collaborates with relevant government authorities on public finance and healthcare regulatory frameworks. Some examples of the ASHK's work in this respect are:

- The ASHK's Professional Standards 1 (PS1), which sets out compliance rules for Appointed Actuaries and Certifying Actuaries, forms the statutory basis of the Insurance (Actuaries' Standards) Regulations (Cap. 41H).
- The Insurance Authority integrates specific ASHK Actuarial Guidance Notes (such as AGN7) in a number of IA Guidelines in its regulatory framework for the insurance industry in Hong Kong.
- The ASHK served as a primary institutional stakeholder engaged in developing the Voluntary Health Insurance Scheme (VHIS) implemented by the Food and Health Bureau in 2019, and the Risk-Based Capital (RBC) regime implemented by the Insurance Authority in 2024.

=== Industry research and publications ===
The ASHK periodically publishes reports about the Hong Kong insurance industry, including the Assured Lives Mortality Table and the Mandatory Provident Fund (MPF) Market Size Projection. These reports are derived based on research undertaken by the society. The Hong Kong Assured Life Mortality Table 2022 (HKA22), released in August 2025, constitutes the fifth systematic population analysis published by the society. This report received coverage from media outlets including the South China Morning Post and Cable TV News. The latest MPF Market Size Projection report was issued in March 2026. This report on the Hong Kong MPF market size projection for 2025–2045 was covered by news platforms such as the Hong Kong Economic Journal and The Standard.

=== International presence ===
At the international level, ASHK representatives contribute to the delivery of international actuarial events, such as IAA meetings. ASHK member Alex Wong serves on the executive committee of the IAA for the 2026–2029 term, and the society's members participate actively in five of the international body's specialized committees.

== Continuing professional education and examinations ==
The ASHK organizes seminars, webinars, and conferences covering topics such as industry updates, professionalism, and actuarial practices, which qualify for Continuing Professional Development (CPD) credits. As a partner organization of the international actuarial streaming platform actuview, the society contributes video recordings of its educational events to the platform, making these professional learning resources accessible to the broader actuarial community.

Historically, for Fellowship admission the ASHK did not conduct its own set of actuarial examinations, and instead relied on the exam systems of other established overseas actuarial bodies approved by the council. Since 2019, the ASHK has administered its own professional actuarial examination for the ASHK Certificate (Certificate in Hong Kong Insurance Markets and Regulations), which is now a standard requirement for Fellow Member admission.

== Publications ==
The ASHK produces an official quarterly magazine titled Actuzine (精誌), which replaced the legacy ASHK Newsletter format in 2024. This magazine covers topics related to the actuarial profession such as technical content, regulatory updates, market trends, career developments, and professional community activities.
