= German Actuarial Society =

Organization of Germany

The German Actuarial Society or German Association of Actuaries (German: Deutsche Aktuarvereinigung, DAV) is the association of actuaries in Germany. It is a full member of the International Actuarial Association and the Actuarial Association of Europe (AAE). The Association has nearly 5,500 fully qualified members, with further 1,600 students in the process of qualifying. Current chairman of the Association is Guido Bader (since 2019). CEO is Michael Steinmetz. The Headquarter is located in Cologne.

== History ==
On 4 April 1903, Department of Actuarial Science (German: Abteilung für Versicherungsmathematik) of the German Society for Insurance Science (German: Deutscher Verein für Versicherungswissenschaft) — a predecessor to the current Association — was founded in Berlin.

== Qualification Process ==
To become a member of the Association, a student needs to pass a series of examinations. As of 2015, there are a total of nine exams specific to actuarial work, three more exams that deal with areas that affect actuaries but are not mathematical in their nature, and a specialisation exam. There are also two exams to begin the qualification process if a student does not hold a degree in mathematical area. Students who have degrees in mathematics or finance are exempted from some of these exams.
