= Actuarial Society of Turkey =

Organization based in Turkey

The Actuarial Society of Turkey (Turkish: Aktüerler Derneği, TAC) is the association of actuaries in Turkey. It is a professional organisation whose purpose is the advancement of actuarial science applied to life, health, property, casualty, pension and similar risk exposures.

The Society was founded in 1951 under the name Türkiye Aktüerler Cemiyeti and from initial twelve members it has grown to 153. The Society is an associate member of the International Actuarial Association. Current chairman of the Society is Orhun Emre Çelik.

== Members ==
In 1951, there were twelve founding members of the Society:

- Hüsnü Hamit Sayman (Chairman)
- Ziya Cimilli (Vice-chairman)
- Sadi Barlas (Secretary General)
- Rakım Enç (Budget Officer)
- Veysi Midil (Member)
- Necdet Tuğrul (Member)
- Muammer Saka (Member)
- İsmail Karacik (Member)
- Sami Maktalan (Member)
- Adil Üçer (Member)
- Akif Günhan (Member)
- Nurettin Somer (Member)

== Board ==
Current Board of Directors (2016-2018)

- Orhun Emre Çelik (Chairperson)
- Seda Ekizoglu (Vice Chairperson)
- Cenk Yalcin (Secretary General)
- Cagkan Baser (Accountant)
- Asli Sonmez (Publicity Activities)
