= Lithuanian Actuarial Society =

Association of actuaries in Lithuania

The Lithuanian Actuarial Society (Lithuanian: Lietuvos aktuarijų draugija) is the association of actuaries in Lithuania. The Society was founded in 1996. In 2005, it became a full member of the Groupe Consultatif. As of 2011, the Society has 41 members. The current chairman of the Society is Rokas Gylys.
