= Northern Ireland fiscal balance =

Portion of public expenditure in Northern Ireland not covered by local tax revenue

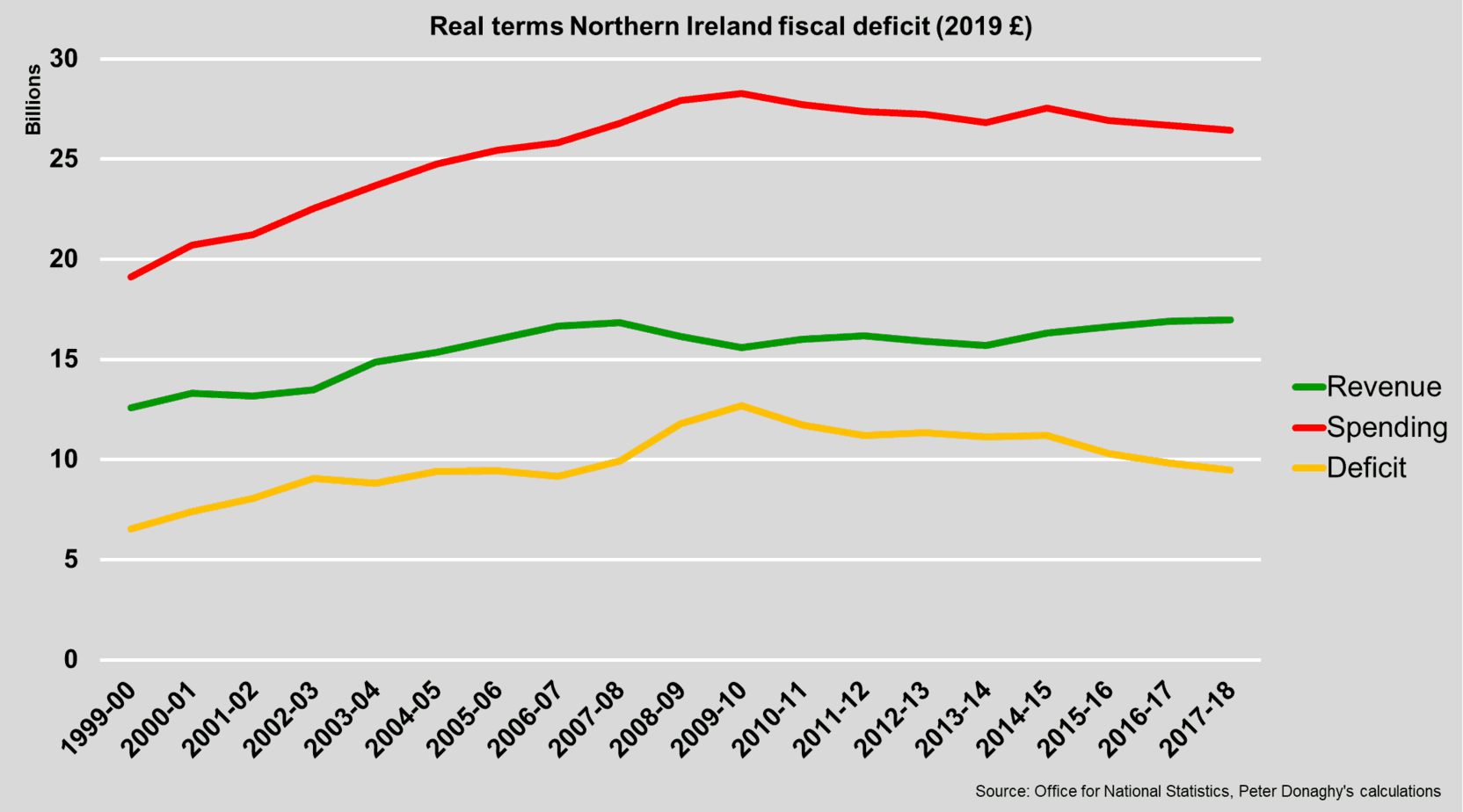
Northern Ireland fiscal deficit from 1999 to 2018

Northern Ireland has a fiscal deficit (also known as a subvention or subsidy) since the public expenditure in the country exceeds the tax revenue. The deficit typically runs at a rate of £10 billion per annum which is more than one third of Northern Ireland's annual fiscal budget. The size of the deficit has been seen by some commentators as a possible impediment to the potential reunification of Ireland.

== History ==
Up until the Great Depression in the 1930s, Northern Ireland ran an annual surplus, and was a net contributor to the UK exchequer. It has run a deficit every year since 1966; that year the deficit was £52 million (£973 million in 2014 pounds). In absolute terms, the subsidy peaked in the 2009–10 fiscal year, when it stood at £11.5 billion in 2014 pounds.

== Subsidy ==
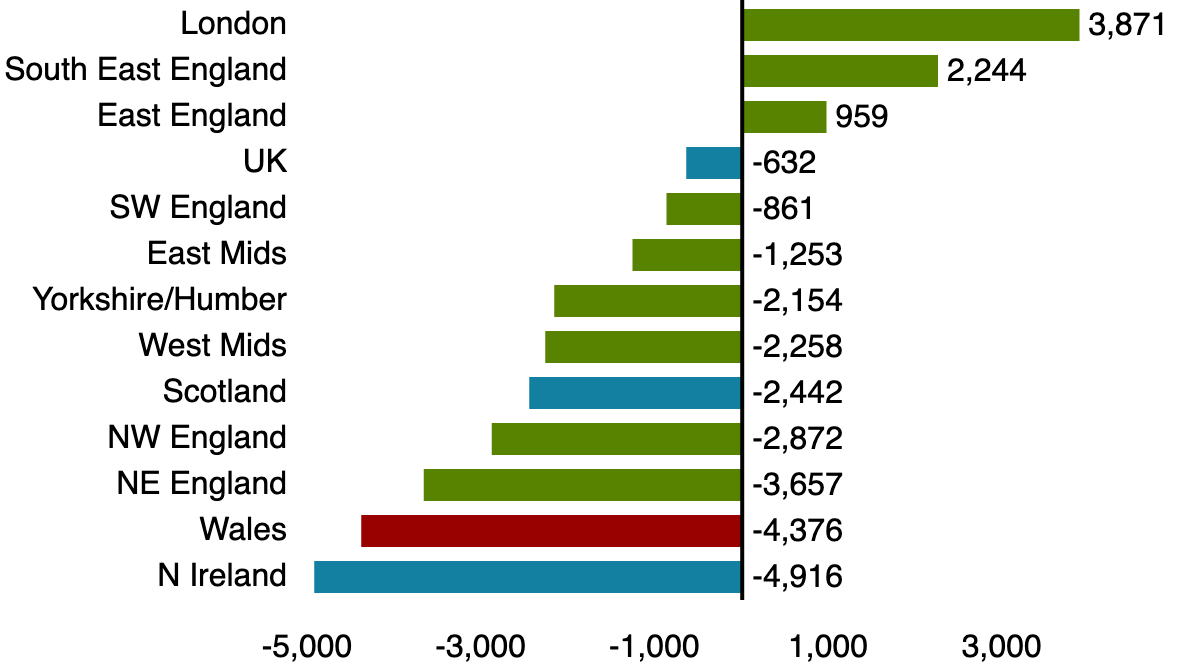
Net fiscal balance by UK nation and region per capita, 2017–18

Nine of the twelve UK statistical regions (the exceptions are London, South East England and East of England) carry a deficit. At nearly £5,000 per capita, Northern Ireland's is the highest, followed by a £4,300 per capita fiscal deficit in Wales and £4,100 in North East England. Although the absolute size of Northern Ireland's deficit has fallen slightly from £9.7 billion in 2016–17 to £9.4 billion in 2018–19, proportional to the size of the economy, the deficit was higher during the 2018–19 fiscal year than any year from 1970 to 2000.

The subsidy paid to Northern Ireland is larger than the net amount of £8.9 billion that the United Kingdom paid to the European Union annually before Brexit. Irish academic Liam Ó Ruairc described Northern Ireland as "dependent upon British financial subsidies".

In 2017, public spending on services was higher in Northern Ireland than any other country of the United Kingdom. In the 2020s, Northern Ireland's government will receive additional funding from the UK exchequer as part of the New Decade, New Approach agreement.

== Opinion polls ==
According to the 2018 Future of England Survey, when asked about whether taxpayer money raised in England should be spent on services in Northern Ireland, 62% of the 666 respondents disagreed. In an editorial in the Irish Times, Paul Gillespie suggested that "Post-Brexit Britain may not want to pay for Northern Ireland".

== Implications ==
Because of its smaller tax base, some experts from the Republic of Ireland say that the country could not make up the subsidy in the event of reunification of Ireland. A 2019 report by John Fitzgerald and Edgar Morgenroth, academics of the Trinity College Dublin, found that withdrawal of the subsidy would cause "calamitous unemployment and emigration". According to their analysis, if the Republic covered the subsidy it would lead to a five to 10 per cent decrease in the standard of living. They recommended reforms in Northern Ireland's economy to reduce the need for subsidy and preserve the possibility of reunification. Dublin economist David McWilliams disagreed; his finding was that reunification would only cost 4% of the Republic's GDP and "in pure budgetary terms, there is little doubt that the Republic’s economy could absorb the north". According to The Economist, covering half of the subsidy would cost 3% of the RoI GDP.

Ulster Unionist politician and economist Esmond Birnie suggested that the fiscal transfer creates moral hazard by relaxing constraints on spending and masking the effects of chronically low productivity and competitiveness. The Alliance Party of Northern Ireland also favours "Modernising and Re-balancing Our Economy" in order to reduce dependence on the subvention.

Some Irish nationalists claim that the deficit is "artificially inflated by statistical trickery", according to a 2020 article in The Economist. In 2021, Dublin City University international relations scholar John Doyle cited argued that the figure of £10 billion fiscal deficit "is a UK accounting exercise" because it includes UK government costs that Northern Ireland would not pay if it left the UK and does not account for predicted economic growth. Doyle "concludes that those elements of the current subvention that are likely to transfer to a united Ireland would represent a deficit of approximately €2.8b". In a reply to the paper, economist Alan Barrett agreed that the real deficit upon reunification would be lower than the official figure for the subvention (9.4 billion) but Barrett argued that it was likely higher than the figure Doyle gave, because Barrett considers it unlikely that the UK would agree to continue paying the full cost of Northern Ireland pensions (3.4 billion) and debt interest (1.6 billion) after reunification.
