= Spanish Institute of Actuaries =

Organization of Spain

The Spanish Institute of Actuaries (Spanish: Instituto de Actuarios Españoles, IAE) is the public law corporation for actuaries in Spain. It was officially founded on 8 January 1959. The Institute is a full member of the International Actuarial Association, the Actuarial Association of Europe, the CERA Global Association, and Unión Profesional. It has 1,700 fully qualified members. The Spanish Institute of Actuaries is under the supervision of the Spanish insurance and pension plans authority (Dirección General de Seguros y Fondos de Pensiones).
