= Brazilian Institute of Actuaries =

Organization of Brazil

The Brazilian Institute of Actuaries (Portuguese: Instituto Brasileiro de Atuária, IBA) is the national association for actuaries in Brazil.

== History ==
The Brazilian Institute of Actuaries was founded in 1944, by mathematicians and researchers interested in extending their field of study to subjects related to actuarial science. Established in Rio de Janeiro, the IBA's main objective is to promote and support research and development initiatives, aiming at improving the scientific study of contingent facts of an economic, financial or biometric nature, in all their aspects and applications.

== Role ==
The Institute is the only entity representing the actuarial profession in Brazil, and for this reason it has concentrated efforts towards becoming a formal regulatory body. This new status would render it more capable to employ the adequate means to address professional issues in this area.

Professional actuaries are required by the Brazilian legislation to register with the National Labor Department prior to their employment in the Brazilian market and, although the IBA has not been assigned any formal responsibility by the government, it plays an important part in this regulation by assuring professional ethics and good practice among professionals. The National Labor Department requires professional actuaries to present one of following documents for registration: Bachelor's degree in actuarial science, duly recognized and registered with the National Department of Education or bachelor's degree in actuarial science from a recognized foreign institution and accepted by the National Department of Education.

In 2002, the International Actuarial Association (IAA) defined a minimum standard syllabus for Actuarial Science courses, with which all affiliated actuarial associations will be required to comply by 2005. With this purpose, and as a member of the IAA, the IBA is committed to implement a certification process using exams to which new applicants would have to be submitted, following a trend already consolidated not only in the United States, but also in Canada and in certain European countries.

As of 2002, the Institute has registered more than 600 members, including individuals and legal entities providing actuarial services, as well as pension funds, capitalization entities and insurance companies. Members are admitted to one of six membership categories after approval by decision of either the Institute's Board of Directors or the Plenary of Members.

== Membership ==
IBA Membership Categories

- Junior Members: students from a recognized graduation course in actuarial science, formally accepted by IBA's Board of Directors;
- Individual Members: actuaries with a bachelor's degree obtained from an accredited Brazilian or foreign institution, admitted by IBA's Board of Directors;
- Organizations: private companies and public entities officially accepted by IBA's Board of Directors;
- Honorary: individuals granted this position by the Plenary of Members as recognition of the value of their work, scientific knowledge or experience in areas related to the objectives pursued by the IBA;
- Meritorious: individuals and legal entities considered by the Plenary of Members to deserve public recognition from the IBA as a result of their legacy, relevant services or donations.
- Correspondents: Brazilian or non-Brazilian residents accepted by the Board of Directors due to their interest in the Institute's activities or to their contribution to the IBA.

== Organization ==
The Board of Directors holds monthly meetings to discuss and decide upon issues relevant to the Institute's interests. Many of the positions assumed by the Board of Directors are based on previous studies carried out by the various existing commissions, which centralize discussions in specific areas such as Pension Funds, General Insurance, Health Insurance, Capitalization Plans, Education, Foreign Relations and Planning of Events.

In every month of September a general meeting is held in order to revise and ratify the Institute's Annual Report, Statements of Accounts and their corresponding Audit reports. This assembly also votes to choose the members to compose the following year's Audit Committee. Every two years, this General Board Meeting also elects the President, the Vice-President and the Board of Directors for the following two-year term.

The IBA maintains a newsletter focusing on topics of actuarial interests: ATUAR. Published bimonthly in Portuguese since January 1996, it has proved to be an efficient channel of communication with associates, bringing news from the Brazilian actuarial market and interviews, as well as book reviews and suggestions of relevant websites and news features.
