= Hans Bühlmann =

Swiss mathematician and actuary (born 1930)

- Bühlmann, c. 1987
- Born: 30 January 1930 (age 96); Chur, Switzerland
- Education: ETH Zurich
- Known for: Bühlmann model Bühlmann–Straub model
- Scientific career
- Fields: Actuarial science, probability theory
- Workplaces: Swiss Re; ETH Zurich
- Thesis: Austauschbare stochastische Variablen und ihre Grenzwertsätze (1959)
- Doctoral advisor: Walter Saxer; Ernst Specker
- Doctoral students: Xuejia Lai

Hans Bühlmann (born 30 January 1930) is a Swiss mathematician and actuary. He was professor of mathematics at ETH Zurich from 1966 to 1997 and president of the institution from 1987 to 1990. He is known for his contributions to credibility theory, particularly the Bühlmann and Bühlmann–Straub models.

== Early life and education ==
Bühlmann was born in Chur and attended the cantonal gymnasium there. He has said that he intended to study languages until about a year before his Matura, when he turned to mathematics instead. He studied mathematics at ETH Zurich, graduating with a diploma in 1955 and a doctorate in 1959. His dissertation dealt with limit theorems for exchangeable random variables and was published by the University of California Press in 1960. The Mathematics Genealogy Project lists Walter Saxer and Ernst Specker as his advisors; Bühlmann himself has credited Saxer with encouraging him to write a dissertation.

== Career ==
While still a student, Bühlmann did an internship at the Swiss Reinsurance Company (now Swiss Re), and he joined the company as an actuary in 1958. From 1961 to 1963 he was a visiting assistant professor at the University of California, Berkeley. During this time he wrote his habilitation thesis, which he submitted to the University of Zurich in 1963. He then returned to Swiss Re as a non-life actuary.

In 1966 he succeeded Saxer as professor at ETH Zurich. Alongside teaching and research, he chaired the university's research commission (1972–1977) and headed the Department of Mathematics (1981–1985). He was dean of the division of mathematics and physics in 1986–1987 and president of ETH Zurich from 1987 to 1990. He retired in 1997.

He also held visiting appointments at several universities in Europe, North America and Asia, including Berkeley (several times, most recently in 1986), the University of Tokyo and the Sapienza University of Rome. In 1995 he became the first holder of the Thomas Bowles Chair at Georgia State University.

Outside the university, Bühlmann chaired ASTIN, the non-life section of the International Actuarial Association, and served as president of the Swiss Association of Actuaries and as editor of the ASTIN Bulletin. He was also a member of the board of directors of Swiss Re.

== Research ==
Bühlmann's research was shaped by problems he had met in actuarial practice. According to ETH Zurich, he promoted the use of rigorous mathematical methods in the field, and during his tenure the university became a recognised centre for probability, statistics, and insurance and financial mathematics.

His 1967 paper "Experience Rating and Credibility" gave credibility theory a statistical formulation based on optimal linear prediction. The resulting Bühlmann model combines the claims experience of an individual risk with information from the collective, with the estimator chosen by a least mean squared error criterion. Under certain conjugate prior assumptions, the Bühlmann estimator coincides with the Bayesian estimator. In 1970, together with his doctoral student Erwin Straub, Bühlmann extended the framework to risks with differing exposure volumes. This extension became known as the Bühlmann–Straub model. The Bühlmann and Bühlmann–Straub methods are now treated as standard material in textbooks on non-life actuarial models. The Insurance Hall of Fame describes his Bayesian approach as foundational to later developments in credibility theory.

At a colloquium held at ETH Zurich for his 90th birthday, the probabilist Hans Föllmer reviewed Bühlmann's research. Besides credibility theory, he highlighted Bühlmann's work on optimal risk exchange, on the "actuary of the third kind", on stochastic discounting and on the market-consistent valuation portfolio. The "actuary of the third kind" goes back to a 1987 ASTIN Bulletin editorial in which Bühlmann described the actuary's role in dealing with the risks of financial assets. His 1970 monograph Mathematical Methods in Risk Theory appeared in Springer's Grundlehren der mathematischen Wissenschaften series. According to the Insurance Hall of Fame, a recurring aim of his work was to bring actuarial, economic and financial methods closer together.

== Honours ==
Bühlmann received honorary doctorates from the University of Amsterdam (1992), the University of London (1993), the University of Waterloo (1995), Sapienza University of Rome (1998) and Heriot-Watt University (2002). The Society of Actuaries gave him its Anderson Memorial Award (1999) and its Presidential Award (2002). In 1998 he was inducted into the Insurance Hall of Fame of the International Insurance Society. He is honorary president of the Swiss Association of Actuaries and of ASTIN.

== Personal life ==
His son, Peter Bühlmann, is a professor of statistics at ETH Zurich.

== Selected works ==
- Bühlmann, Hans (1970). Mathematical Methods in Risk Theory. Grundlehren der mathematischen Wissenschaften. Vol. 172. Berlin: Springer.
- Bühlmann, Hans; Gisler, Alois (2005). A Course in Credibility Theory and its Applications. Universitext. Berlin: Springer. doi:10.1007/3-540-29273-X. ISBN 978-3-540-25753-0.
- Wüthrich, Mario V.; Bühlmann, Hans; Furrer, Hansjörg (2008). Market-Consistent Actuarial Valuation. EAA Lecture Notes. Berlin: Springer.
