= Society of Actuaries of Indonesia =

Organization of Indonesia

The Society of Actuaries of Indonesia (Indonesian: Persatuan Aktuaris Indonesia, PAI) is the association of actuaries in Indonesia. The association was established in 1964. It is a full member of the International Actuarial Association in 2005. As of July 2018, the association has about 271 fully qualified members.

== History ==
Society of Actuaries of Indonesia was founded in 1964 by top executives who worked in insurance company and actuarial consulting firm. In the beginning this organization consisted of only 25 members. As government created new regulation to extend actuarial role in insurance industry, now the members of the organization comprises 180 Fellows and 200 Associates.
