= Society of Actuaries in Ireland =

Organization of Ireland

The Society of Actuaries in Ireland is the professional body of Irish actuaries. The Society was founded on 3 May 1972 by seventeen fellow members of the Institute and the Faculty of Actuaries residing in Ireland. Since then, the membership has grown to more than 2,100. The current president of the Society is Michael Culligan.

The Society is a full member of the International Actuarial Association and the Actuarial Association of Europe.

== Membership ==
The Society of Actuaries in Ireland offers five types of membership:

- Student
- Associate
- Fellow
- Honorary fellow
- Affiliate

The Society does not hold its own examinations and its members gain fellowship through the examinations organised by the Institute and the Faculty of Actuaries. As of 2023, the Society has more than 2,100 members, with more than 1,400 of them fully qualified.
