= Democratic Association of Victoria =

First socialist organisation in Australia

The Democratic Association of Victoria was the first socialist organisation in Australia. The group was founded in February 1872, but it lasted less than a year. Its political outlook was largely utopian socialist. The group borrowed more inspiration from Robert Owen, Charles Fourier and John Stuart Mill rather than Karl Marx and Friedrich Engels. However, the organisation did borrow material from The Communist Manifesto in some sections of its programme. The organisation became the Australian section of the International Working Men's Association in September 1872, the international organisation led by Marx (the 'First International'). George Scammel Manns was the Secretary of DAV. The group published the journal The Internationalist between February-August 1872.

The launching of DAV was received with negative reactions from the local mainstream press (which also had expressed hysterical reactions towards the Paris Commune). DAV had connections with trade union groups. It also established a cooperative store and a Needlewomen's Cooperative. After the dissolution of Democratic Association of Victoria, ten months after its founding, it would take a decade until socialism would re-emerge as an organised force. During this period, however, there were many different democratic, republican and pro-land reform groups active. The Democratic Association of Victoria produced some offshoots, such as Victorian Cooperative Association and the Land Tenure Reform League.

== See also ==
- Socialism in Australia
