= New Zealand Society of Actuaries =

Organization of New Zealand

The New Zealand Society of Actuaries is the professional body to which actuaries practising in New Zealand normally belong. The society was founded in 1957 and incorporated in 1976.
