= Welsh fiscal balance =

Gap between government spending in Wales and local tax revenue

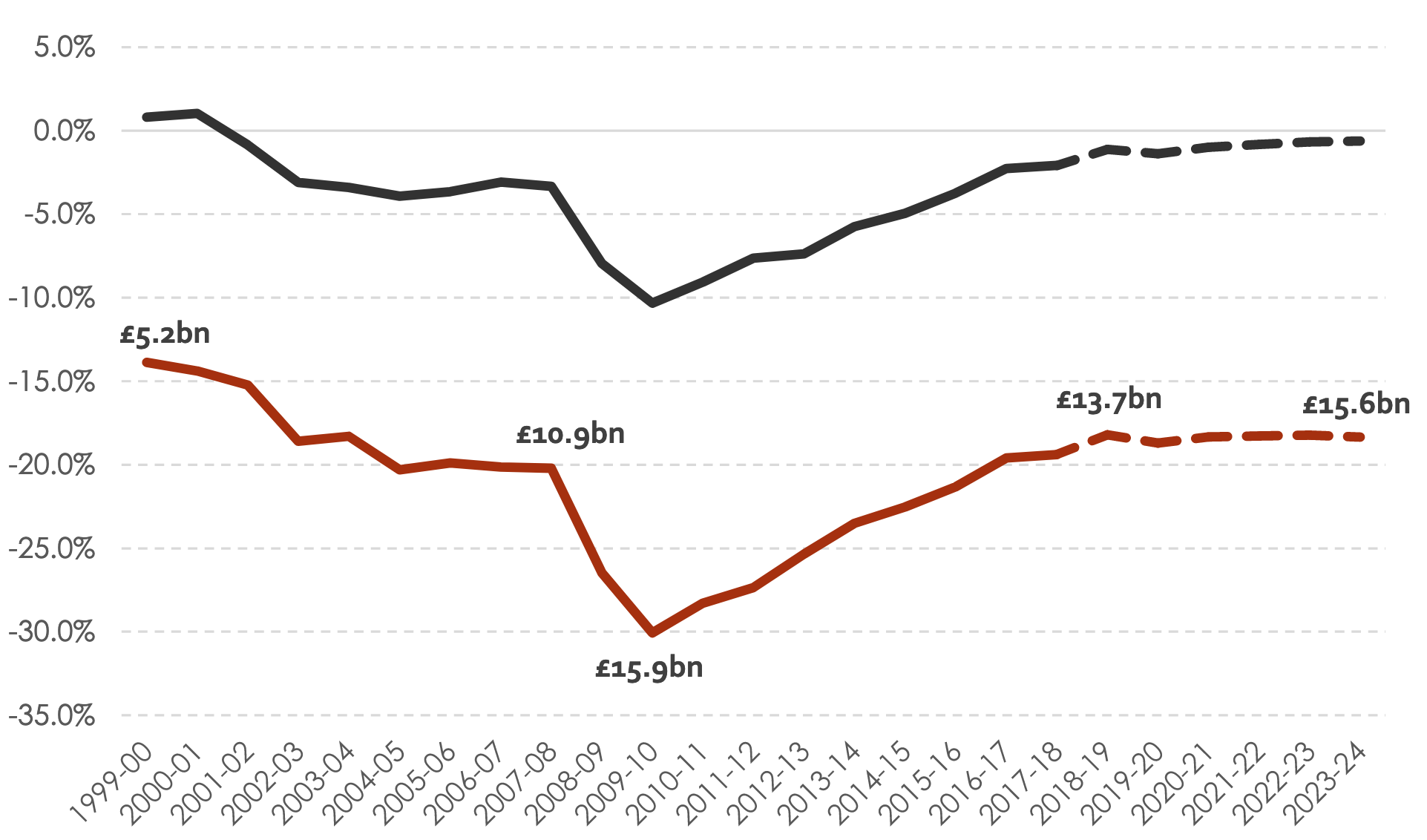
Net fiscal balance of Wales (red) and the UK (blue). Zero represents balance while negative numbers are deficits measured in percent of GDP

From 1999 to 2022 Wales has had a negative fiscal balance, due to public spending in Wales exceeding tax revenue. For the 2018–19 fiscal year, the fiscal deficit was about 19.4 percent of Wales's estimated GDP, compared to 2 percent for the United Kingdom as a whole. Most of the nations and regions of the UK have a deficit, with only, England as a whole, East of England, South East England and London having a surplus. Wales' fiscal deficit per capita of £4,300 is the second highest of the economic regions, after the Northern Ireland fiscal deficit, which is nearly £5,000 per capita.

== Fiscal deficit ==
"Estimates consistently find that Wales has a large and persistent fiscal deficit, funded by transfers from rUK." Wales, as well as England, has a fiscal deficit since the public expenditure in both countries exceeds the tax revenue collected. The Welsh government has limited powers over taxation and does not set its own budget.

Wales' net fiscal deficit increased from £14.4 billion in 2020 to £25.9 billion in 2021. All countries and regions in the UK had a fiscal deficit in 2021, which included the North West of England at £49.9 billion; Scotland at £36 billion; Northern Ireland at £18 billion; London at £7.2 billion.

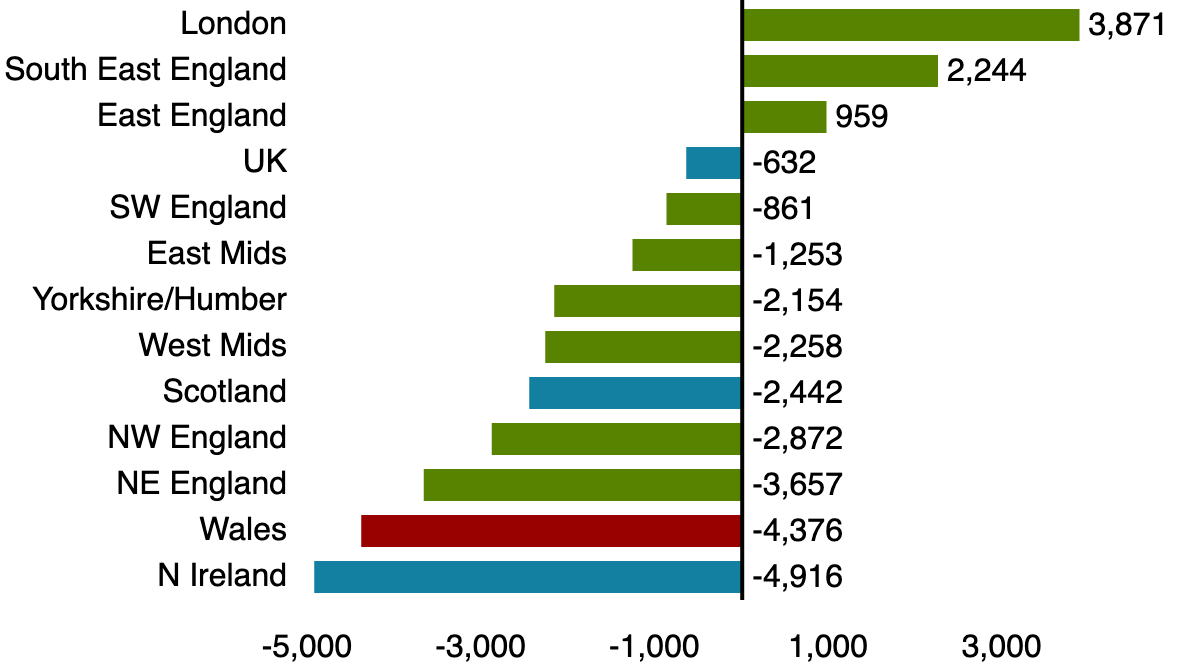
Net fiscal balance by UK nation and region per capita, 2017–18

At £4,300, Wales' fiscal deficit per capita is the second highest of the economic regions, after the Northern Ireland fiscal deficit, which is nearly £5,000 per capita. Tax revenue per capita in Wales is 76 percent of the UK average, but spending is 108 percent, leading to a shortfall. Wales spends more on social security than other parts of the UK; capital expenditure on infrastructure such as transport (which is not devolved to Wales) is significantly less. By comparison, the entire UK fiscal deficit was £350 billion between 2019 and 2020. The total UK public debt exceeds £2 trillion (which is equivalent to 85% of GDP).

In 2016, Wales spent £14.7 billion more than it was allowed to gather in local revenue, which decreased to £13.7 billion for the 2018–19 fiscal year, due to a reduction in public spending. Public spending peaked in 2011–12. For the 2018–19 fiscal year, the fiscal deficit is about 19.4 percent of Wales's estimated GDP, compared to 2 percent for the United Kingdom as a whole.

Year	UK fiscal deficit as a percentage of GDP	Wales fiscal deficit as a percentage of GDP	Difference
2021-22	-6.4%		
2020-2021	-14.8%	(£25.9 billion deficit, unknown GDP)	
2019-2020	-2.7%	-18.4%	-15.7%
2018-19	-2.0%	-18.0%	-16.0%
2017-18	-2.0%	-19.4%	-17.4%
2016-2017	-2.3%	-19.6%	-17.3%
2015-2016	-3.8%	-21.3%	-17.5%
2014-2015	-4.8%	-22.5%	-17.7%
2013-2014	-5.5%	-23.5%	-18%
2009-2010	-7.4%	-29.5%	-22.1%

=== Implications ===
Wales spends 11 percent more per person than England. Welsh economist Ed Gareth Poole notes that fiscal transfers between wealthier and poorer parts of a sovereign state are not unusual. The gap in Wales was covered by transfer payments from the rest of the UK. Such transfer payments, according to the economist Robert A. Mundell, are essential to a functional currency union.

== Figure in an independent Wales ==
A 2023 study by three researchers at the Wales Governance Centre at Cardiff University found that the deficit means a "difficult economic outlook for an independent Wales", and recommended that constitutional debate should take into account fiscal realities.

The figure has been criticised as misrepresentative of the true financial position that an independent Wales would experience. Commentators contend that a sovereign Wales could raise additional revenues and reduce expenditure on items not directly connected to the Welsh economy; the Welsh economist John Ball suggests that an independent Welsh government could plug the budget shortfall by instituting land value tax (possibly raising £6 billion per year), tourist tax and "exploring some ways in which taxation revenue could be improved in a sovereign state". In his opinion, VAT revenues from businesses not owned by Welsh residents are underestimated in the current revenue data, meaning that the shortfall may not be as high as it appears.

Ball also suggests that Wales' £3bn defence cost is excessive and that at 3% of GDP is more than any other country. He also notes that incoming pensioners from England cost £2bn and a further “accounting adjustment” of another £3bn. The vast number of external business ownership in Wales makes it difficult to estimate the amount of VAT actually collected in Wales and which is allocated to the business headquarters in England. An independent Welsh government would decide how much to spend on matters such as defence and could have its own currency.

According to political scientist John Doyle of Dublin City University, the fiscal deficit in the "early days" of an independent Wales would be approximately £2.6bn. This equates to under 3.4% of GDP, which compares to an average of 3.2% for countries in the OECD in 2019.

Think tank Melin Drafod suggests that an independent Wales could have a fiscal balance in surplus of £3 billion a year which could be used to fund public services. The think tank says that this revenue could be raise via different taxation and other policy changes.

== See also ==
- United Kingdom national debt
