= Alan Barrett (economist) =

Irish economist

Alan Michael Barrett was the Director of the Economic and Social Research Institute until June 2025. He joined the ESRI in 1994 and took up the position of Director in July 2015. His research is primarily focused on labour economics and population economics and is widely published. He worked as Project Director of the Irish Longitudinal Study on Ageing (TILDA) at Trinity College Dublin and has served as a member of the Irish Fiscal Advisory Council. He is a Research Fellow with the Institute for the Study of Labor in Bonn, Germany and an Honorary Fellow of the Society of Actuaries in Ireland. He is also a member of the National Expert Advisory Council on Climate Change.

== Education ==
Barrett received a B.A. (mod) degree in Economic and Social Studies from Trinity College Dublin in 1989 and a Master of Arts degree in 1991 from Michigan State University. In 1994, he was awarded a Ph.D. from Michigan State University with a thesis entitled “Three Essays on the Labor Market Characteristics of Immigrants”.

== Career ==
Barrett joined the ESRI in 1994, upon completing his Ph.D. Since then, his research has been widely published in journals such as Labour Economics, Journal of Population Economics, Oxford Review of Economic Policy, Economics Letters, Industrial and Labor Relations Review, British Journal of Industrial Relations, European Journal of Population, International Migration Review, Population Research and Policy Review, Economic and Social Review and National Institute Economic Review.

In 1997 he co-authored a book on environmental economics, The Fiscal System and the Polluter Pays Principle: A Case-study of Ireland. Between 2005 and 2010, he was a co-author of the ESRI’s Quarterly Economic Commentary, providing analysis of current economic trends and economic forecasts.

Between 2001 and 2003, Alan was seconded to the Department of Finance where he worked on the long-term fiscal implications of population ageing. Between 2011 and 2013, he was seconded to the Irish Longitudinal Study on Ageing (TILDA) at Trinity College Dublin where he worked as Project Director. He was a member of the Irish Fiscal Advisory Council from 2011 to 2015.

He was co-editor of the IZA Journal of European Labor Studies from 2012 to 2015 and was the founding Editor of the Policy Section of the Economic and Social Review from 2009 to 2011.

He is a Research Fellow with IZA (Institute for the Study of Labor) in Bonn, Germany and an Honorary Fellow of the Society of Actuaries in Ireland. He is also a member of the National Expert Advisory Council on Climate Change.

In 2019 he was admitted as a member of the Royal Irish Academy.

== Publications ==
Barrett’s recent publications are listed below. A full list of Barrett’s publications is available on the ESRI website.

- The Impact of Adult Child Emigration on the Mental Health of Older Parents
- Determining Labour and Skills Shortages and the Need for Labour Migration in Ireland
- Scoping the Possible Economic Implications of Brexit on Ireland
- Tax Breaks and the Residential Property Market
- How Well-Informed are Pension Scheme Members on Their Future Pension Benefits? Evidence from Ireland
- Business Migration to Ireland
- Aging and the Labor Market
- A New Look at the Recession and Ireland's Older People: The Emigration of Adult Children and the Mental Health of their Parents
- Income and Wealth in the Irish Longitudinal Study on Ageing
- The Long-Term Impact of Childhood Sexual Abuse on Incomes and Labour Force Status
