= Israel Association of Actuaries =

Organization of Israel

The Israel Association of Actuaries is the association for actuaries in Israel.
