= International Congress of Actuaries =

The International Congress of Actuaries (ICA) is a conference held under the auspices of the International Actuarial Association every three or four years. The most recent conference was the 33rd Congress held in Sydney, Australia in 2023. Future congresses are planned for Tokyo, Japan in 2026, and Nairobi, Kenya in 2029.

== Past congresses ==
- 1895 Brussels, Belgium
- 1898 London, United Kingdom
- 1900 Paris, France
- 1903 New York, United States
- 1906 Berlin, Germany
- 1909 Vienna, Austria
- 1912 Amsterdam, Netherlands
- 1915 St. Petersburg, Russia (organised but not held)
- 1927 London, United Kingdom
- 1930 Stockholm, Sweden
- 1934 Rome, Italy
- 1937 Paris, France
- 1940 Lucerne, Switzerland (organised but not held; papers published)
- 1951 Scheveningen, Netherlands
- 1954 Madrid, Spain
- 1957 New York, United States and Toronto, Canada
- 1960 Brussels, Belgium
- 1964 London and Edinburgh, United Kingdom
- 1968 Munich, Germany
- 1972 Oslo, Norway
- 1976 Tokyo, Japan
- 1980 Zurich and Lausanne, Switzerland
- 1984 Sydney, Australia
- 1988 Helsinki, Finland
- 1992 Montreal, Canada
- 1995 Brussels, Belgium
- 1998 Birmingham, United Kingdom
- 2002 Cancun, Mexico
- 2006 Paris, France
- 2010 Cape Town, South Africa
- 2014 Washington, D.C., United States
- 2018 Berlin, Germany
- 2023 Sydney, Australia

== Future congresses ==
- 2026 Tokyo, Japan
- 2029 Nairobi, Kenya
