= Actuarial Association of Europe =

Umbrella financial organization

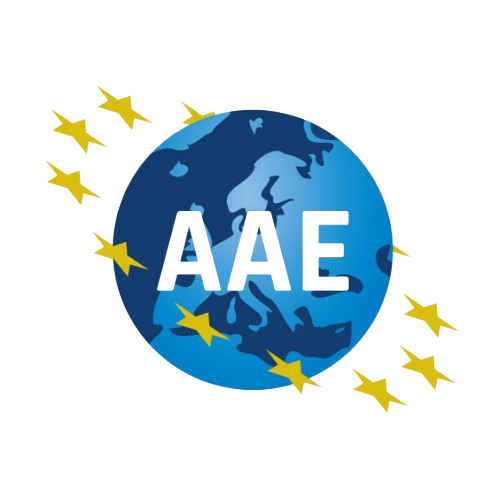

The Actuarial Association of Europe (AAE) is the umbrella organization representing the actuarial profession across Europe. It was established in 1978 under the name Groupe Consultatif des Associations d'Actuaires des Pays des Communautés Européennes (GC),. The name was later changed to Groupe Consultatif Actuariel Européen in 2002, and finally to its current name on January 1, 2014.

The AAE provides independent actuarial advice to key institutions of the European Union – the Commission, the Council of Ministers, the European Parliament, EIOPA (European Insurance and Occupational Pensions Authority). Its focus is on technical input and professional insight on issues related to insurance, pensions, risk management, demographics, climate risk, financial regulation, and broader public policy.

As of 2025, the AAE currently has 38 member associations in 37 European countries, representing over 29,000 actuaries. Advice and comments provided by the AAE on behalf of the European actuarial profession are totally independent of industry interests.. The AAE is listed in the EU Transparency Register under number 550855911144-54.

Structure and Activities

The AAE is governed by a General Assembly and a Board, supported by a network of Committees and Subcommittees. These groups focus on specialized areas, including:

- Insurance
- Pensions
- Risk Management
- Professionalism
- Education
- Demographics (formerly Mortality)
- Climate-related and Sustainability Risk
- Data Science and Artificial Intelligence

Its work is powered by volunteers from its member associations, who contribute their expertise to technical discussions, policy recommendations, and regulatory consultations.

The AAE also contributes to the continuing professional development (CPD) of actuaries by offering seminars and webinars. It is actively involved in pan-European events, such as the European Actuarial Day (EAD) and the European Congress of Actuaries (ECA).

Through position papers, public statements, and consultation responses, the AAE provides the actuarial perspective on issues affecting European citizens and institutions.

External Links

- Official website of the Actuarial Association of Europe

== Member associations ==
There are two categories of Member Associations in the AAE:

=== Full Member ===
Situated in a Member State of the EU or another European country and meeting the professionalism criteria defined in Article 5 of the Statutes:

Aktuarvereinigung Österreichs	Austria
Institut des Actuaires en Belgique/Instituut van de Actuarissen in België	Belgium
Bulgarian Actuarial Society	Bulgaria
Channel Islands Actuarial Association	Channel Islands
Hrvatsko Aktuarsko Drustvo	Croatia
Cyprus Association of Actuaries	Cyprus
Česká Společnost Aktuárů	Czech Republic
Den Danske Aktuarforening	Denmark
Eesti Aktuaaride Liit	Estonia
Suomen Aktuaariyhdistys	Finland
Institut des Actuaires	France
Deutsche Aktuarvereinigung	Germany
Hellenic Actuarial Society	Greece
Magyar Aktuárius Társaság	Hungary
Félag íslenskra tryggingastærðfræðinga	Iceland
Society of Actuaries in Ireland	Ireland
Italian Society of Actuaries (ISOA)	Italy
Latvijas Aktuäru Asociãcija	Latvia
Lietuvos Aktuarų Draugija	Lithuania
Institut Luxembourgeois des Actuaires	Luxembourg
Het Koninklijk Actuarieel Genootschap	Netherlands
Den Norske Aktuarforening	Norway
Polskie Stowarzyszenie Aktuariuszy	Poland
Instituto dos Atuarios Portugueses	Portugal
Asociaţia Română de Actuariat	Romania
Slovenská spoločnost’ aktuárov	Slovakia
Slovensko Aktuarsko društvo	Slovenia
Instituto de Actuarios Españoles	Spain
Col.legi d’Actuaris de Catalunya	Spain
Svenska Aktuarieföreningen	Sweden
Association Suisse des Actuaires	Switzerland
Aktüerler Derneğì Türkiye	Turkey
Institute and Faculty of Actuaries	UK

=== Observer Member ===
Situated in a Member State of the European Union, or in another European State, but not meeting the criteria for full membership:

Malta Actuarial Society	Malta
Asociaţia de Actuariat din Moldova	Moldova
Crnogorsko Aktuarsko Društvo	Montenegro
Udruženje Aktuara Srbije	Serbia
Society of Actuaries of Ukraine	Ukraine
