= Outline of actuarial science =

Overview of and topical guide to actuarial science

The following outline is provided as an overview of and topical guide to actuarial science:

Actuarial science – discipline that applies mathematical and statistical methods to assess risk in the insurance and finance industries.

== What type of thing is actuarial science? ==
Actuarial science can be described as all of the following:

- An academic discipline –
- A branch of science –
  - An applied science –
    - A subdiscipline of statistics –

== Essence of actuarial science ==
Actuarial science

- Actuary
- Actuarial notation

== Fields in which actuarial science is applied ==
- Mathematical finance
- Insurance, especially:
  - Life insurance
  - Health insurance
- Human resource consulting

== History of actuarial science ==
History of actuarial science

== General actuarial science concepts ==
=== Insurance ===
- Health insurance

==== Life Insurance ====
- Life insurance
- Life insurer
- Insurable interest
- Insurable risk
- Annuity
- Life annuity
- Perpetuity
- New Business Strain
- Zillmerisation
- Financial reinsurance
- Net premium valuation
- Gross premium valuation
- Embedded value
- European Embedded Value
- Stochastic modelling
- Asset liability modelling

==== Non-life Insurance ====
- Property insurance
- Casualty insurance
- Vehicle insurance
- Ruin theory
- Stochastic modelling
- Risk and capital management in non-life insurance

==== Reinsurance ====
Reinsurance

- Financial reinsurance
- Reinsurance Actuarial Premium
- Reinsurer

=== Investments & Asset Management ===
- Dividend yield
- PE ratio
- Bond valuation
- Yield to maturity
- Cost of capital
- Net asset value
- Derivatives
- Portfolio risk management

=== Mathematics of Finance ===
Financial mathematics

- Interest
- Time value of money
- Discounting
- Present value
- Future value
- Net present value
- Internal rate of return
- Yield curve
- Yield to maturity
- Effective annual rate (EAR)
- Annual percentage rate (APR)

=== Mortality ===
- Force of mortality
- Life table

=== Pensions ===
Pensions

- Stochastic modelling

=== Other ===
- Enterprise risk management
- Fictional actuaries
- Financial risk management § Insurance
- Actuarial credentialing and exams

== Persons influential in the field of actuarial science ==
- List of actuaries

== See also ==
- Index of accounting articles
- Outline of economics
- Outline of corporate finance
- Outline of finance

== Professional Organizations/Associations for Actuaries ==
- CCA - Conference of Consulting Actuaries
- CAS - Casualty Actuarial Society
- SOA - Society Of Actuaries
