= James C. Hickman =

American actuary (1927–2006)

James C. Hickman (August 27, 1927 – September 10, 2006) was an American actuary. He was internationally publicized for his work in actuarial education as well as being a major contribution in the development of the actuarial profession. He was a professor emeritus of business and statistics and former dean of the University of Wisconsin–Madison School of Business.

== Private life ==
James Hickman was born on August 27, 1927, in Indianola, Iowa. His father (also named James C. Hickman) owned a small shop on the town's square. Hickman went to Simpson College where he earned his bachelor's degree in mathematics with an emphasis in actuarial science in 1950. From there he went on to the University of Iowa to get his master's degree in mathematical statistics in 1952. He earned a doctorate in 1961 from the University of Iowa.

In 1952, Hickman married his wife Margaret, with whom he had three children, Charles, Don and Barbara. He loved the outdoors and completed a number of bicycle tours through Nova Scotia, Colorado, Alaska and California. He also enjoyed climbing mountains and worked briefly as a forest ranger before entering academic life.

After fighting cancer Hickman died on September 10, 2006, at the age of 79.

== Professional life ==
He started as a part-time instructor at University of Iowa in 1951. After obtaining his master's degree in 1952 Hickman worked briefly for Bankers Life Company in Des Moines, Iowa. He then went on to earn his Doctorate from the University of Iowa in 1961. During this time he was working in their mathematics and statistics department and was named a full professor in 1967. He left UI after only five years as a full professor, and in 1972 he went to the University of Wisconsin–Madison. Later (in 1985) he would be named the dean of the School of Business at the University of Wisconsin–Madison. He was dean until 1990 and left the University of Wisconsin–Madison faculty in 1993.

In 2006, then UW Business School Dean Michael Knetter said, "While research and academic work was Jim's passion, he also provided great leadership for the School of Business at a critical period when our alumni became more engaged and supportive of our efforts." He went on to say, "As dean, Jim was instrumental in the effort to develop, design and build Grainger Hall. He was a great role model for many of us and will be missed by the entire community."

While serving as dean Hickman raised $40 million in support of a new building, Grainger Hall which was named after businessman David Grainger. He also was successful in initiating curriculum changes which included a major revision of the M.B.A. program and the establishing of new programs in the marketing research and distribution management.

James Hickman has written numerous articles. He was co-author of Actuarial Mathematics which is the center of the Society of Actuaries' education program. He was on the board of governors of both Beta Gamma Sigma and the Society of Actuaries (which he was also vice-president). He was a fellow of the Society of Actuaries (or FSA), and an associate of the Casualty Actuarial Society (or ACAS). Hickman has been involved with many organizations and advisory groups at the local, state, and national levels, sharing his expertise on a variety of issues, such as health care, workers' compensation, and social security.

He was the winner of the 1981 and 1984 Halmstad Prize of the Actuarial Education and Research Fund for best contributions to actuarial science literature. He also won the business school's 1985 Erwin A. Gaumnitz Distinguished Faculty Award for outstanding teaching, research and public service.

== Notable books by James Hickman ==
- Finite Mathematics and Finite Mathematics with Calculus, by Robert V. Hogg, Ronald H. Randles, A.J. Schaeffer and James C. Hickman, Cummings Publishing, (1974)
- Actuarial Mathematics, by Newton L. Bowers, James C. Hickman, Cecil J. Nesbitt, Donald A. Jones and Hans U Gerber, Society of Actuaries, (May 1997)
- The Old-Age Crisis: Actuarial Opportunities the 1996 Bowles Symposium, by James C. Hickman, GA.) BOWLES SYMPOSIUM (1996 ATLANTA), Society of Actuaries (March 1999)
