= Actuarial credentialing and exams =

To become a qualified actuary, the actuarial credentialing and exam process usually requires passing a series of professional examinations over a period of several years.

In some countries, such as Denmark, most study takes place in a university setting. In others, such as the U.S., most study takes place during employment through a series of examinations. In the UK, and countries based on its process, there is a hybrid university-exam structure.

== Australia ==
The education system in Australia is divided into three components: an exam-based curriculum; a professionalism course; and work experience. The system is governed by the Institute of Actuaries of Australia.

The exam-based curriculum is in three parts. Part I relies on exemptions from an accredited under-graduate degree from either Bond University, Monash University, Macquarie University, University of New South Wales, University of Melbourne, Australian National University or Curtin University. The courses cover subjects including finance, financial mathematics, economics, contingencies, demography, models, probability and statistics. Students may also gain exemptions by passing the exams of the Institute of Actuaries in London. Part II is the Actuarial control cycle and is also offered by each of the universities above. Part III consists of four half-year courses of which two are compulsory and the other two allow specialization.

To become an Associate, one needs to complete Part I and Part II of the accreditation process, perform 3 years of recognized work experience, and complete a professionalism course. To become a Fellow, candidates must complete Part I, II, III, and take a professionalism course. Work experience is not required, however, as the Institute deems that those who have successfully completed Part III have shown enough level of professionalism.

== China ==
In China, both China Association of Actuaries (CAA) and Actuarial Society of Hong Kong (ASHK) have their own associate-ship and fellowship credentialing processes. The CAA holds its own system of examinations, while ASHK holds only examination of "Certificate in Hong Kong Insurance Markets and Regulations" (ASHK Certificate). Note that CAA exams were suspended in 2014 but reintroduced in 2023 in an updated structure.

To achieve associate-ship, the CAA requires examination with 5 subjects: (1) probability and mathematical statistics, (2) finance and economics, (3) actuarial mathematics, (4) actuarial models and data analytics, (5) actuarial risk management; while ASHK recognizes associate-ship credentials from Society of Actuaries (SOA), Casualty Actuarial Society (CAS), Institute and Faculty of Actuaries (IFoA), and Institute of Actuaries of Australia (IAA).

To achieve fellowship, the CAA offers 7 tracks: (1) life insurance, (2) non-life insurance, (3) health insurance, (4) social insurance and pension planning, (5) financial risk management, (6) asset management, and (7) data science, each requires examination with another 5 subjects; while ASHK requires fellowship credentials from either of the 4 organizations above and passing the ASHK Certificate examination.

== Denmark ==
In Denmark it normally takes five years of study at the University of Copenhagen to become an actuary with no professional experience requirement. There is a focus on statistics and probability theory, and a requirement for a master's thesis. By Danish law, responsibility for the practice of any life insurance business must be taken by a formally acknowledged and approved actuary. Approval as a formally responsible actuary requires three to five years of professional experience.(Haastrup & Nielsen 2007)

== Germany ==
Current rules for the German Actuarial Society require an actuary to pass more than 13 exams.

== India ==
The Institute of Actuaries of India (formerly Actuarial Society of India) offers both associate-ship and fellowship classes of membership. However, prospective candidates must be admitted to the society as students before they achieve associate-ship or fellowship. The exam sequence is similar to the British model, with Core and Specialty technical and application exams. The exams are conducted twice a year during the months of May–June and October–November. Starting from January 2012, the institute has started conducting entrance exam. Only those applicants who clear the entrance test can appear for the Core Technical papers.

== Japan ==
The education system in Japan is administrated by Institute of Actuaries of Japan (IAJ), with associateship and fellowship credential levels.

The IAJ's requirement for associateship include passing the primary examination with 5 basic subjects: (1) mathematics, (2) life insurance mathematics, (3) non-life insurance mathematics, (4) pension mathematics, (5) accounting, economics and investment theory.

The IAJ offers 3 tracks for fellowship: life insurance, non-life insurance, and pension. Each requires passing the secondary examination with 2 advanced subjects.

== Norway ==
In Norway the education to become an actuary takes five years. The education usually consists of a bachelor's degree (three years) and a master's degree (two years). The bachelor's degree needs to contain a specific number of courses in mathematics and statistics. The master's degree usually consists of one year of courses and one year writing a master's degree about a topic related to the actuarial profession. The University of Bergen and The University of Oslo offer the education to become an actuary in Norway. To become an international qualified actuary, a person with a Norwegian actuarial education must also take two courses in economics (macroeconomics and accounting) and a course in ethics. The ethics course, which lasts a day, is offered by the Norwegian Society of Actuaries.

== South Africa ==
Actuaries in South Africa are served by the Actuarial Society of South Africa (ASSA). Until 2010, the requirement to qualify as an actuary in South Africa was to pass the exams hosted by the UK bodies. Starting in 2010, a South African actuarial qualification hosted by ASSA has replaced this arrangement. Key changes include exam syllabuses based on South African-specific content. The UK actuarial professional bodies, however, still support qualification through the UK. Students may receive exemption from part of the examinations for qualification from approved universities. The South African qualification does have mutual recognition with many of the international actuarial bodies as well as approval of the syllabus from the International Actuarial Association.

One may obtain the Chartered Enterprise Risk Actuary (CERA) designation through the ASSA.

South Africa pioneered the actuarial banking route, with fellowship exams (equivalent to the UK's SA exams) in banking beginning in the late 2010s.

== Sweden ==
Actuarial training in Sweden takes place at Stockholm University. The five-year master's program (for those with no previous university-level knowledge in mathematics, or without a bachelor's degree in mathematics) covers the subjects mathematics, mathematical statistics, insurance mathematics, financial mathematics, insurance law and insurance economics. The program operates under the Division of Mathematical Statistics.

== Taiwan ==
Qualification in Taiwan is administrated by Actuarial Institute of the Republic of China (Taiwan) (AIRC/AICT), with associateship and fellowship credential levels.

The AIRC/AICT offers 3 tracks for its membership: life insurance, general insurance, and pension. Although with own design of education system, the AIRC/AICT practically only holds exams testing knowledge specifically to Taiwan and mainly recognizes examination credits from Society of Actuaries (SOA), Casualty Actuarial Society (CAS), Institute and Faculty of Actuaries (IFoA), Institute of Actuaries of Australia (IAA), and Institute of Actuaries of Japan (IAJ). The associateship and fellowship credentials from these organizations are also recognized. The AIRC/AICT has coordinated with SOA and CAS to integrate the Taiwanese exams into their education systems (SOA Regulation and Taxation Module and CAS Exam 6T).

== United Kingdom and Ireland ==
Qualification in the United Kingdom and Ireland consists of a combination of exams and courses provided by the Institute and Faculty of Actuaries. The exams may only be taken upon having officially joined the body, unlike many other countries where exams may be taken earlier. Most trainee actuaries study while working for an actuarial employer using resources provided by ActEd (The Actuarial Education Company, a subsidiary of BPP Actuarial Education Ltd.), which is contracted to provide actuarial tuition for students on behalf of Institute and Faculty Education Ltd (IFE), a subsidiary of the Institute and Faculty of Actuaries.

However, a candidate may offer proof of having previously covered topics (at a high enough standard, usually while at university) to be exempt from taking certain subjects.

The exams themselves are split into four sections: Core Principles (CP), Core Practices (CP), Specialists Principles (SP), and Specialist Advance (SA). For students who joined the Profession after June 2004, a further requirement that the student carry out a "Work-based skills" exercise has been brought into effect. This involves the student submitting a series of essays to the Profession detailing the work that he or she has performed. In addition to exams, essays and courses, it is required that the candidate have at least three years' experience of actuarial work under supervision of a recognized actuary to qualify as a Fellow of the Institute of Actuaries (FIA) or of the Faculty of Actuaries (FFA).

Exam code	Exam title	Format
CM1	Actuarial Mathematics	Session based exam
CM2	Financial Engineering and Loss Reserving	Session based exam
CS1	Actuarial Statistics	Session based exam
CS2	Risk Modelling and Survival Analysis	Session based exam
CB1	Business Finance	Session based exam
CB2	Business Economics	Session based exam
CB3	Business Management	Online exam
CP1	Actuarial Practice	Session based exam
CP2	Modelling Practice	Online exam
CP3	Communications Practice	Online exam

Note that the UK Profession is currently introducing the Certified Actuarial Analyst (CAA) qualification to "provide those working in financial and actuarial roles at a technical level around the world with valuable skills and a well respected qualification".

== United States and Canada ==
=== Credentialing organizations ===
In the U.S., for life, health, and pension actuaries, exams are given by the Society of Actuaries, while for property-casualty actuaries the exams are administered by the Casualty Actuarial Society.

To sign certain statements of actuarial opinion, however, American actuaries must be members of the American Academy of Actuaries. Academy membership requirements include membership in one of the recognized actuarial societies, at least three years of full-time equivalent experience in responsible actuarial work, and either residency in the United States for at least three years or a non-resident or new resident who meets certain requirements. Continuing education is required after certification for all actuaries who sign statements of actuarial opinion.

The Canadian Institute of Actuaries (the CIA) recognizes fellows of both the Society of Actuaries and the Casualty Actuary Society, provided that they have specialized study in Canadian actuarial practice. For fellows of the SOA, this is fulfilled by taking the CIA's Practice Education Course (PEC). For fellows of the Casualty Actuarial Society, this is fulfilled by taking the nation-specific Exam 6-Canada, instead of Exam 6-United States. Further, the CIA requires three years of actuarial practice within the previous decade, and 18 months of Canadian actuarial practice within the last three years, to become a fellow.

=== Education and exams ===
The Society of Actuaries' requirements for Associateship (ASA) include passing 6 preliminary examinations (probability, financial mathematics, fundamentals of actuarial mathematics, statistics for risk modeling, predictive analytics, and one from either advanced long-term actuarial mathematics or advanced short-term actuarial mathematics), validating educational experience (VEE) in 3 fields (economics, accounting and finance, and mathematical statistics), completing self-learning series and passing their assessments (advanced topics in predictive analytics, five-module fundamentals of actuarial practice), and taking a course on professionalism. For Fellowship (FSA), three other modules, three or four exams depending on specialty track, and a special fellowship admission course is added. Additionally, students can obtain a variety of micro-credentials, which represent intermediary recognition for a candidate's distinct knowledge and skills earned along the pathway to ASA, which can be utilized to demonstrate achievements to employers, co-workers, and professional networks. The Casualty Actuarial Society requires the successful completion of seven examinations, two modules, and economics and corporate finance VEEs for Associateship and three additional exams for Fellowship. In addition to these requirements, casualty actuarial candidates must also complete professionalism education and be recommended for membership by existing members.

Depending on which society a student chooses to pursue, there are six or seven preliminary exams. Most of the exams are multiple choice and administered on computers at Prometric testing centers. Candidates are allowed to use a calculator from an approved list. The exams are timed and last between three and four hours. Some tests provide instant feedback as to whether or not a candidate has passed that particular exam (see table below). All test scores (on a 0-10 scale with 6 or higher passing) are posted six to eight weeks after the exam window ends. The scores are based on ratios to the pass mark; for example, a 6 indicates that the candidate received 100% to 110% of the passing score required for that sitting. Similarly, scoring less than 50% of the passing score would yield a 0, and scoring 150% or more of the passing score would yield a 10. A sufficiently high pass mark could thus render a grade of 10 impossible if there are not enough points on the exam to score over 150% of that requirement.

Society of Actuaries (SOA) Exams
Exam code	Exam title	Introduced	Preceded by	Ceased	Superseded by
P	Probability	2005	Course 1	Current exam	
FM	Financial Mathematics	2005	Course 2	Current exam	
FAM	Fundamentals of Actuarial Mathematics	2023	Part of exams LTAM and STAM	Current exam	
SRM	Statistics for Risk Modeling	2018	None	Current exam	
ALTAM	Advanced Long-Term Actuarial Mathematics	2023	Part of exam LTAM	Current exam	
ASTAM	Advanced Short-Term Actuarial Mathematics	2023	Part of exam STAM	Current exam	
PA	Predictive Analytics	2018	None	Current exam	
IFM	Investment and Financial Markets	2018	Exam MFE	2022	Exam cancelled
LTAM	Long-Term Actuarial Mathematics	2018	Exam MLC	2022	Exam ALTAM and part of exam FAM
STAM	Short-Term Actuarial Mathematics	2018	Exam C	2022	Exam ASTAM and part of exam FAM
MFE	Models for Financial Economics	2007	Part of exam M	2017	Exam IFM
MLC	Models for Life Contingencies	2007	Part of exam M	2017	Exam LTAM
C	Construction and Evaluation of Actuarial Models	2005	Course 4	2017	Exam STAM
M	Actuarial Models	2005	Course 3	2006	Exams MFE and MLC
1	Mathematical Foundations of Actuarial Science	2000	Education system redesign	2005	Exam P and VEE
2	Interest Theory, Economics and Finance	2000	Education system redesign	2005	Exam FM and VEE
3	Actuarial Models	2000	Education system redesign	2005	Exam M
4	Actuarial Modeling	2000	Education system redesign	2005	Exam C and VEE

Casualty Actuarial Society (CAS) Exams
Exam code	Exam title	Introduced	Preceded by	Ceased	Superseded by	SOA eqv.
1	Probability	2005	Exam 1 (2000)	Current exam		P
2	Financial Mathematics	2005	Exam 2 (2000)	Current exam		FM
MAS-I	Modern Actuarial Statistics I	2018	Exam S	Current exam		—N/a
MAS-II	Modern Actuarial Statistics II	2018	Exam 4 (2005)	Current exam		—N/a
3F	Investment and Financial Markets	2018	Exam 3F (2007)	2022	Exam cancelled	IFM
S	Statistics and Probabilistic Models	2015	Exams LC and ST	2017	Exam MAS-I	—N/a
3F*	Models for Financial Economics	2007	Part of exam 3 (2003)	2017	Exam 3F (2018)	MFE
4	Construction and Evaluation of Actuarial Models	2005	Exam 4 (2000)	2017	Exam MAS-II	C
LC	Models for Life Contingencies	2013	Part of exam 3L	2016	Exam S	—N/a
ST	Models for Stochastic Processes and Statistics	2014	Part of exam 3L	2016	Exam S	—N/a
3L	Models for Life Contingencies and Statistics	2007	Part of exam 3 (2003)	2013	Exams LC and ST	—N/a
3	Statistics and Actuarial Models	2003	Exam 3 (2000)	2007	Exams 3L and 3F (2007)	—N/a
1*	Mathematical Foundations of Actuarial Science	2000	Education system redesign	2005	Exam 1 (2005)	1
2*	Interest Theory, Economics and Finance	2000	Education system redesign	2005	Exam 2 (2005) and VEE	2
4*	Actuarial Modeling	2000	Education system redesign	2005	Exam 4 (2005)	4
3*	Actuarial Models	2000	Education system redesign	2003	Exam 3 (2003)	3
Note: Exam codes with asterisk (*) indicate the code was reused later in a different title.
