= Community Living Assistance Services and Supports Act =

Former U.S. Federal Law

- Long title: Title VIII of The Patient Protection and Affordable Care Act.
- Acronyms (colloquial): CLASS Act
- Enacted by: the 111th United States Congress
- Effective: March 23, 2010

Codification
- Acts repealed: January 1, 2013

Legislative history
- Introduced in the House as the "Service Members Home Ownership Tax Act of 2009" (H.R. 3590) by Charles Rangel (D–NY) on September 17, 2009; Committee consideration by Ways and Means; Passed the House on October 8, 2009 (416–0); Passed the Senate as the "Patient Protection and Affordable Care Act" on December 24, 2009 (60–39) with amendment; House agreed to Senate amendment on March 21, 2010 (219–212); Signed into law by President Barack Obama on March 23, 2010

The Community Living Assistance Services and Supports Act (or CLASS Act) was a U.S. federal law, enacted as Title VIII of the Patient Protection and Affordable Care Act. The CLASS Act would have created a voluntary and public long-term care insurance option for employees, but in October 2011 the Obama administration announced it was unworkable and would be dropped. The CLASS Act was repealed January 1, 2013.

Under the Act the Department of Health and Human Services was to set the terms prior to implementation, but determined the program was not viable and could not go into effect.

The CLASS Act had been "a key priority" of the late Senator Edward "Ted" Kennedy.

== Key provisions ==
Most of the terms were to be developed by the Department of Health and Human Services over several years. However, certain terms were set in statute:

- Enrollees would have paid a monthly premium, through payroll deduction
- Enrollees would have been covered on a guaranteed-issue basis
- Enrollees would have been eligible for benefits after paying premiums for five years and having worked at least three of those years
- Enrollees would have received a lifetime cash benefit after meeting benefit eligibility criteria, based on the degree of impairment

== Timeline for provisions ==
- June 21, 2010: Required the Secretary to establish a Personal Care Attendants Workforce Academy Advisory Panel for the purpose of examining and advising the Secretary and Congress on workforce issues related to personal care attendants
- By January 1, 2011: Established the CLASS Program, as specified
- By January 1, 2011: Addressed infrastructure for personal care attendant workers
- By January 1, 2011: Required information on supplemental coverage from the CLASS program in the National Clearinghouse for Long-Term Care Information
- By January 1, 2012: Would have required the Secretary to (1) establish an Eligibility Assessment System (2) enter into agreements with the Protection and Advocacy System for each state; and (3) enter into agreements with public and private entities to provide advice and assistance counseling.
- By October 1, 2012: Would have required the Secretary to designate a benefit plan as the CLASS Independence Benefit Plan and publish such designation, along with details of the plan and the reasons for the Secretary's selection, in a final rule to allow for a public comment period.
- Beginning January 1, 2014: Would have required the Secretary to submit an annual report to Congress on the CLASS program, as specified.

== Goals of the legislation ==
=== Expanded availability of long-term care ===
According to Barbara Manard, a health economist with LeadingAge, the act would have created "a national insurance trust" with a potential "daily cash benefit on the order of about $50 to $75 a day, depending on your level of disability."

=== Reduce near-term government deficit ===
The Congressional Budget Office estimated the program would have resulted in $72 Billion in deficit reduction in the first ten years, including $2 Billion in Medicaid savings because of individuals receiving benefits under the CLASS Act that they could have received under Medicaid, and because no benefits would be paid out at all in the first five years. However, in the longer term, the CBO noted that "In the decade following 2029, the CLASS program would begin to increase budget deficits" as payouts increased, with the trust fund remaining solvent for a seventy-five year period but running bankrupt after that. The effect on the deficit in the ten-year budget window was particularly important due to the Byrd Rule.

== Premiums ==
Premium rates were to be determined by the Department of Health and Human Services with subsidies for low-income individuals and students. Premium rates would have varied by issue age. The CLASS program contained an implicit redistribution tax to subsidize lower income and full-time student participants.

== Benefits ==
The legislation did not set specific benefits. The Secretary of Health and Human Services was tasked with developing actuarially sound premiums and benefits.

Many organizations, including the Congressional Budget Office, developed estimates of potential premiums and benefits:

Analyst	Average Daily Benefit	Estimated Monthly Premium	
ACLI	$90/day	$140/month	
CBO (June 25, 2009)	$75/day	$65/month for initial decade, rising to $100/$110 for subsequent cohorts	
CBO (July 6, 2009)	$75/day	$65/month for initial decade; after 2019, benefits dropped to $50/day and premiums for new enrollees raised to $85/month	
AAA/SOA	$75/day	$125/month	
Mercer Group	About $75/day [2-3 ADLs = $50/day; 4+ ADLs= $100/day]	$61/month to $123/month, depending on participation rate and disability trends	
ACLI	$50/day	$107/month to $117/month	
AAA/SOA	$50/day	$86/month	0

Benefits would have varied by severity of functional limitation, with the average being at least $50 per day. The benefit schedule could have been adjusted in future years by the Secretary.

== Enrollment process ==
Employers would have auto-enrolled employees through payroll deduction, a negative election similar to some 401(k) plans.

== Tax treatment ==
Tax treatment would have been the same as for tax-qualified long-term care plans (i.e., benefits would not have been taxable and premiums might have been eligible for medical expense deduction).

== Limitations ==
Participation would have been limited to employees actively at work, and required a five-year vesting period (including three working years) prior to benefit eligibility.

The CLASS program did not extend coverage to an employee's family members. It was not clear how non-working spouses could enroll in the program or receive benefits due to the requirement that the beneficiary must have had sufficient earnings to be credited with income quarters under the Social Security Act.

The statute says, "No taxpayer funds shall be used for payment of benefits under a CLASS Independent Benefit Plan... the term ‘taxpayer funds’ means any Federal funds from a source other than premiums.... and any associated interest earnings."

== Administrative expense ==
Administrative expenses, including advocacy and assistance counseling, were to be limited to three percent of premiums.

== Repeal efforts ==
- On April 4, 2011, senators John Thune and Lindsey Graham introduced the Repeal the CLASS Entitlement Act citing the potential of it becoming a new entitlement program. It was predicted that enrollees requiring large medical payouts would be attracted to the plan, leading to the inability of the collected premiums to cover all costs.
- On July 19, 2011, the Senate so-called Gang of Six, a bipartisan group of senators proposed to repeal the CLASS act as part of a proposal for a balanced budget legislation.

=== Abandoned by Obama Administration ===
On October 14, 2011, HHS Secretary Kathleen Sebelius announced that the Obama Administration would not attempt to implement the C.L.A.S.S. Act stating "I do not see a viable path forward for Class implementation at this time." One actuary opined that adverse selection could make the program financially unsustainable. If correct, this would be because too many people likely to need benefits later in life would buy the insurance, with people unlikely to need the benefits not buying because of the relatively high premiums and the fact the program was voluntary. This would result in more benefits being paid than premiums collected.

=== Repeal ===
On January 1, 2013, the CLASS Act was officially repealed as part of the American Taxpayer Relief Act of 2012, known as the Fiscal Cliff Bill. This law contains a provision that repeals the Community Living Assistance Services and Supports Act.

== Criticisms ==
Republican opponents of the plan called it "a financial gimmick" to manipulate the Congressional Budget Office deficit projections for the PPACA, while Democratic Senator Kent Conrad called it a "Ponzi scheme," because (a) projected premiums during the vesting period were counted as revenue during the first decade but promised spending would have begun in the second decade, so the CBO's 10-year estimates included the revenue but not the spending, and (b) benefits would cost more than premiums.

Timothy Carney of the Washington Examiner wrote that the Act would have encouraged revolving door behavior, calling the Act "an 'unsustainable' subsidy to companies whose former executives helped write it, and which are now hiring the congressional staff that helped write it."

== Similar legislation ==
In 2019, Washington State passed the WA Cares Act, which created a similar system, the first at the state level in the U.S. As of 2022, implementation has been delayed in order to address some criticisms of various provisions.
