= Mary Hardy (actuary) =

Mary Rosalyn Hardy is a professor of actuarial science at the University of Waterloo (Canada). She pioneered, together with Julia Wirch, the development and application of the conditional tail expectation (CTE).

== Biography ==
Hardy studied mathematics at the University of London and holds a PhD from Heriot-Watt University in Edinburgh. She has served as editor of the North American Actuarial Journal and she was previously editor of Annals of Actuarial Science.

Hardy is a Fellow of the Society of Actuaries and also a Fellow of the UK Institute and Faculty of Actuaries. She was elected to the Board of Governors for the Society of Actuaries in 2004 and was elected vice-president for 2007-2009.

=== Academic career ===
Hardy's joint work with Julia Wirch pioneered the development and application of the conditional Tail Expectation (CTE) as a tool for evaluating the capital required to cover the risk embedded in certain insurance contracts. Her research has direct applications to the risk management of life insurance companies.

She has written the textbook Investment Guarantees: Modelling and Risk Management for Equity Linked Life Insurance and is co-author of Actuarial Mathematics for Life Contingent Risk.

In 2012 the UK Institute and Faculty of Actuaries awarded a Finlaison Medal to Hardy in recognition of her service to the profession, both within the UK and internationally, in education, research, transition of research into practice and governance in furthering these aims.
