= Actuarial control cycle =

The actuarial control cycle is a specific business activity which involves the application of actuarial science to real world business problems. The actuarial control cycle requires a professional within that field (i.e., an actuary) to specify a problem, develop a solution, monitor the consequences thereof, and repeat the process. The Society of Actuaries in the US, and the IFoA in the UK is increasingly integrating the actuarial control cycle into the examination/qualification process as a framework that helps to define actuarial projects.
