= Carol Jagger =

Professor of the epidemiology of ageing

Carol Jagger (born December 1951) is professor of the epidemiology of ageing at Newcastle University. Her research relates to the impact of an ageing population on society. Jagger is a Chartered Statistician and Chartered Scientist, a Fellow of the Royal Statistical Society and the Gerontological Society of America and an Honorary Fellow of the Institute and Faculty of Actuaries.

== Life ==
Carol Jagger was born in December 1951. She earned a Bachelor of Science with Honours in mathematics, followed by a Master of Science in statistics from the University of Leeds. She then completed a PhD in statistics from the University of Leicester. Jagger worked as a medical statistician at Leicester, and then was appointed to a personal chair in 2000. She was the AXA Professor of Epidemiology at Newcastle University, but she retired in 2021. Her research related to the impact of an ageing population on society. She was Deputy Director of the Newcastle University Institute for Ageing.

Jagger was a member of several national and international committees including the Public Health England Productive Healthy Ageing and Dementia Expert Advisory group, the Advisory Board for the University of Liverpool EPSRC Centre for Mathematics in Healthcare, the ONS National Population Projections Expert Advisory Panel, and the Finnish Centre of Excellence in Research on Ageing and Care Expert Advisory group. She was appointed as an associate editor of the journal Age and Ageing in 2007.

== Fellowships ==
Jagger is a Chartered Statistician and Chartered Scientist. She is a Fellow of the Royal Statistical Society and the Gerontological Society of America and an Honorary Fellow of the Institute and Faculty of Actuaries.
