= Louise Pryor =

British actuary

- Born: 20 April 1960 (age 66); United Kingdom
- Other name: Louise Margaret Pryor
- Education: Newnham College, Cambridge and Northwestern University
- Occupation: Actuary
- Known for: Modelling the economic impacts of climate change

Louise Margaret Pryor (born 20 April 1960) is a British actuary with a focus on sustainability, and is chair of the Ecology Building Society.

== Early life and education ==
Pryor has an MA in Mathematics (1981) from Newnham College, Cambridge and a PhD in computer science (1993) from Northwestern University. She is an associate fellow of Newnham College. She qualified as a fellow of the Institute of Actuaries (FIA) in 1985.

== Career ==
Pryor has been described as a "pioneer in modelling the financial and economic impacts of climate change in insurance", and has worked in various roles and consultancies in the field of actuarial work and climate change.

She was a lecturer at the Universities of Birmingham (1993–1994) and Edinburgh (1994–1996).

She was director of the Board for Actuarial Standards, an operating body of the Financial Reporting Council, which drew up "the first set of technical standards for actuarial work to be developed by an independent standard setting body in the world".

She was chair of the London Climate Change Partnership, later renamed as the London Climate Ready Partnership, from 2019 to 2023.

Pryor was president of the Institute and Faculty of Actuaries (IFoA) in 2021–2022. She is co-chair of Actuaries' Carbon Collaboration, which is a working group of the IFoA and is "working towards a coherent understanding of the issues around carbon emissions and offsets by considering them in an actuarial context".

Pryor was appointed chair of the Ecology Building Society in May 2022.

== Recognition ==
Pryor is a fellow of the Institute of Environmental Management and Assessment.

In 2024 she was awarded an honorary Doctorate of Science by Anglia Ruskin University.
