= Michael R. Powers =

American academic

Michael Roland Powers
- Born: November 19, 1959 (age 65)
- Education: Yale University; Harvard University
- Occupation(s): Professor, Statistician, Author
- Known for: Zurich Insurance Group Chair Professor of Finance at Tsinghua University

Michael Roland Powers (Chinese: 包迈高; pinyin: Bāo Màigāo; born November 19, 1959) is an American academic who is the Chair Professor of Finance at Tsinghua University’s School of Economics and Management (SEM) in China. Since 2014, he has held a dual appointment as professor at Tsinghua's Schwarzman College. An internationally recognized risk and insurance expert, he was a 2011 recipient of China’s Thousand Talents Plan award. In 2013, he won the Kulp-Wright Book Award for Acts of God and Man: Ruminations on Risk and Insurance (2012, Columbia University Press).

== Research ==
Powers has published numerous scholarly articles on a variety of risk-related topics, with particular focus on issues of government regulation and public policy. His major research contributions include: the introduction of intertemporal discounting into collective risk theory (actuarial ruin theory); the derivation of the “Powers-Shubik square-root rule” for the approximate number of reinsurance companies operating in a national insurance market; and a utility-theoretic solution of the Two Envelopes Paradox. A frequent collaborator of the late Martin Shubik, he is responsible for promoting the application of game-theoretic modeling in insurance and actuarial science. In Acts of God and Man, he proposed a science of risk based upon: a fundamentalist Bayesian (i.e., subjective/judgmental) approach to modeling uncertainty; a formal distinction between the "aloof" risks of insurance and the "non-aloof" risks of other financial markets; and a personalized scientific method emphasizing randomized controlled studies, mathematical and game-theoretic modeling, and statistical simulation.

== Career ==
Powers was appointed Deputy Insurance Commissioner for the Commonwealth of Pennsylvania (a sub-cabinet-level post in the state government) in 1987, and subsequently was responsible for designing Pennsylvania’s current “choice” no-fault automobile insurance system. He joined the faculty of Temple University’s Fox School of Business in 1990, and moved to Tsinghua University in 2011. In 2013, he succeeded Professor David Daokui Li as chair of Tsinghua’s finance department, serving in that position until 2015.

== Books ==
- The Political Economy of Chinese Finance, 2016, co-edited with J. Jay Choi and Xiaotian Tina Zhang, Emerald Group Publishing, Bingley, UK.
- Acts of God and Man: Ruminations on Risk and Insurance, 2012, Columbia University Press, New York.
- Icons, 2003, Dry Bones Press, San Francisco (science-fiction/fantasy novel).
- Global Risk Management: Financial, Operational, and Insurance Strategies, 2002, co-edited with J. Jay Choi, JAI Press/Elsevier, Amsterdam.
- The Economics and Politics of Choice No-Fault Insurance, 2001, co-edited with Edward L. Lascher, Jr., Kluwer Academic Publishers, Boston.

== Education ==
Powers received his B.S. in Applied Mathematics, summa cum laude, from Yale University and his Ph.D. in Statistics from Harvard University. At Harvard, he wrote his dissertation under the direction of John W. Pratt.

== Other activities ==
During the 2008 U.S. Presidential election campaign, Powers’ comments on the relative life expectancies of candidates John McCain and Barack Obama received media attention when cited by actor Matt Damon and others as a cause for concern. He has published occasional commentary at the Huffington Post, and is a regular panelist on China Radio International's Biz Today and World Today programs.
