= Elias S.W. Shiu =

American actuarial scientist

Elias Sai Wan Shiu is a Professor of Actuarial Mathematics at the University of Iowa, and an internationally renowned actuarial scientist.

== Biography ==
Shiu graduated from California Institute of Technology in 1975 after completing a PhD in mathematics, specializing in operator theory. Prior to joining the University of Iowa, he worked as a consultant for the Great-West Life Assurance Company in Canada and as a tenure-stream faculty member at the Warren Centre for Actuarial Studies and Research at the University of Manitoba, where he served as the Acting Head of the Department of Actuarial Science. He joined the University of Iowa as the Principal Financial Group Professor in 1992. Shiu was one of the early editors for the academic journal, Insurance: Mathematics and Economics, a top-tier actuarial science journal, for which he now serves as an honorary editor. He is also a co-editor of the journal North American Actuarial Journal. Shiu is also a Distinguished Shiu is best known for his work on option pricing by Esscher transforms and contributions to the development of ruin theory, including the seminal paper "On the Time Value of Ruin". The Gerber-Shiu function, which is a subject of study in ruin theory to analyze the probability and severity of insolvency of insurance companies, is named after Elias S.W. Shiu and Hans-Ulrich Gerber. His research papers have won four Halmstad Prizes, which recognized outstanding research work in the field of actuarial science. Shiu is an Associate of the Society of Actuaries and served on a wide range of professional exams committees. Owing to his great scientific contributions, Shiu was awarded an honorary doctoral degree from the University of Lausanne, Switzerland. The International Gerber-Shiu Workshop series is also named after Elias S.W. Shiu and Hans-Ulrich Gerber. In 2014, the University of Hong Kong hosted the 5th International Gerber-Shiu Workshop in honor of Professor Shiu on the occasion of his 65th birthday. Shiu is the Doctor of Science honoris causa of the Hang Seng University of Hong Kong.

== Publications ==
- Gerber, Hans U.; Shiu, Elias S.W. (1998), "On the Time Value of Ruin", North American Actuarial Journal, 2, Society of Actuaries: 48–72, doi:10.1080/10920277.1998.10595671, S2CID 59054002
- Option Pricing by Esscher Transforms (PDF), Society of Actuaries
