= Mary Hardy =

Mary Hardy may refer to:

- Mary Hardy (actuary), professor of actuarial science
- Mary Hardy (diarist) (1733–1809), English brewer's wife and diarist
- Mary Anne Hardy (c.1825–1891), English novelist and travel writer
- María Cordero Hardy (born 1932), Puerto Rican scientist whose research has helped in the understanding of the properties of vitamin E
- Mary Hardy (comedian) (1931–1985), Australian comedian

== See also ==
- Mary Hardy Reeser (1884–1951), suspected victim of spontaneous human combustion
- Marieke Hardy (born 1976), Australian writer, broadcaster, television producer and actress
