= Rakesh Sethi =

Rakesh Sethi may refer to:

- Rakesh Sethi (banker)
- Rakesh Sethi (chef)
