= Shubhalakshmi Panse =

Indian Banker

Chairperson and Managing Director, Allahabad Bank
- In office October 2012 – January 2014

Personal details
- Citizenship: India
- Education: Drexel University (MBA); Savitribai Phule Pune University (MSc, Diploma in Business Management, Master's in Management and Finance)
- Occupation: Corporate executive, former banker
- Committees: Reserve Bank of India's P. J. Nayak Committee and External Advisory Committee, Chairperson of the Quality Review Board at Institute of Actuaries of India

Shubhalakshmi Panse, also known as Subhalakshmi Aamod Panse, is an Indian banker and the former Chairperson and Managing Director of Allahabad Bank (2012-2014) and the first woman to lead one of India's oldest banking institutions. During her tenure, Panse led multiple non-performing asset (NPA) recovery drives and improved the training program for fresh recruits to solve the bank's talent deficit. She also served as the Executive Director of Vijaya Bank and General Manager at Bank of Maharashtra.

Panse served on Reserve Bank of India's P.J. Nayak and External Advisory Committees to improve banks governance and regulations. She also served on Central Government of India appointed Quality Review Board for selection of senior public sector bank executives. She was appointed as the Chairperson of the Quality Review Board at the Institute of Actuaries of India.

== Education ==
Panse holds a Master of Science (M.Sc.) degree in zoology as a gold medalist from Savitribai Phule Pune University. While pursuing a doctorate degree in embryology at Pune University, she qualified for a post at the Bank of Maharashtra and joined it in 1976. In 1993, while working full-time in the commercial bank, she completed a masters degree in Management and finance from the University of Pune. She also holds a diploma degree in Business Management from the same university. While on sabbatical in 1998, she completed her MBA with specialization in Bank Management from Drexel University. She is also a Certified Associate of the Indian Institute of Bankers (CAIIB).

== Career ==
Panse joined the Bank of Maharashtra as a Probationary Officer in 1976 and advanced to the post of General Manager over three decades. She served as the head of Information Technology department and circle head for South India covering Karnataka, Andhra Pradesh, Tamil Nadu, Kerela and Pondicherry.

=== Vijaya bank ===
In November 2009, Panse was appointed as the Executive Director at Vijaya Bank where she managed various segments like credit, recovery and fund management. Prasad describes Panse as a leader possessing "courage and foresight" and a "true maestro of leadership".

She led the initiative of opening accounts for school and college students. She also introduced the facility for them to start deposits in multiples of Rs10 per month for 10 years, to serve as margin money for future student loans. She co-launched an e-deposit facility for customers, thus increasing the CASA ratio and increased ad flow and branding hoardings to attract young customers. Panse also conducted roadshows in Abu Dhabi and Dubai to tap young NRI customers. In recovery management, Panse's personal efforts led to the recovery of a 7-crore non-performing loan from a client's widower. During her tenure, the bank's deposits grew by 13.56% in FY2009-2010 and by 16.81% in FY2012-2013.

=== Allahabad bank ===
In 2012, Panse was appointed as the Chairperson and Managing Director (CMD) of the state-owned Kolkata-based Allahabad Bank and became the first woman to head one of India's oldest banking institutions.

Upon taking charge, Panse addressed the hidden Rs 1,700 crore non-performing assets (NPA) identified by Reserve Bank of India's inspection. She established a daily tracking system, with her 48 zonal managers, and trebled the loan recovery targets, resulting in recoveries increasing from Rs300-400 crore to 900 crore in her first quarter, Rs1,100 crore in her second, Rs 1,200 crore in her third and Rs 1,500 crore in her fourth quarter. She also sold Rs540 crore of NPAs to Asset Reconstruction Companies (ARC).

To solve the middle level management talent shortage in the bank, Panse improved the on-boarding process and hired external HR consultants. She extended the new officer training from a week to three months, in addition to giving one month's training to fresh clerical staff.

During FY2012-2013, the bank's business grew by 13.92% YoY, deposits grew by 12%YoY. The bank also focused on technology to lower transaction costs and opened 200 new branches and 131 ATMs to support future growth. Panse retired from Allahabad Bank in January 2014.

== Advisory committee member ==
Panse served on the Reserve Bank of India's (RBI) P.J. Nayak Committee (2014) to review and provide recommendations to strengthen banks regulatory compliance requirements, guidelines for ownership and representation in banks' boards.

She was also appointed as a member of RBI's External Advisory Committee (2015) to evaluate the applications for setting up payments banks. She was also part of government panels formed to elect top-level executives like Chairpersons, Managing Directors, and Executive Directors for public sector banks.

In addition, she was appointed by Central Government of India as the Chairperson of the Quality Review Board (QRB) at the Institute of Actuaries of India.

== Award and recognition ==
- Best Banker - Financial Inclusion - Large by the Sunday Standard Best Banker's Awards - 2013
- Suryadatta National Award - for excellence in the field of social service

== Personal life ==
Panse was born in Jodhpur and her father served in the India Air Force. As her father had a transferable job, she attended school in Agra, Delhi and Pune. She married Aamod Panse, who encouraged her to focus on her career after the couple faced multiple miscarriages.
