= I. M. Rubinow =

Theorist on social insurance (1875–1936)

Isaac Max Rubinow
- Courtesy of the Isaac M. Rubinow Papers, Kheel Center, Cornell University, Ithaca, NY.
- Born: 1875; Grodno Belarus
- Died: September 1, 1936 (aged 60–61); The Bronx, New York
- Occupation: Actuary

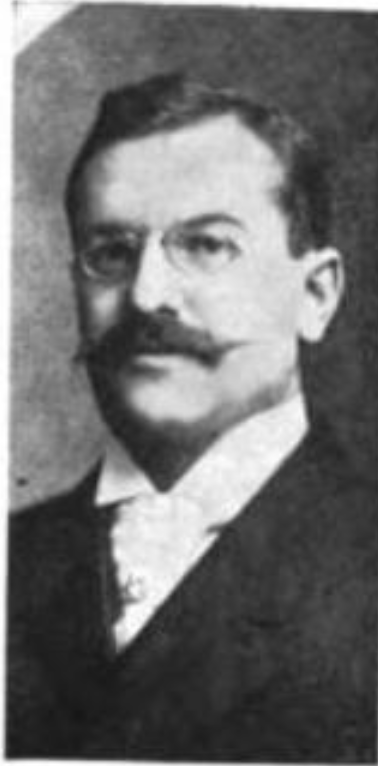
Rubinow in 1906

Isaac Max Rubinow (1875 – September 1, 1936) was a Russian-born American economist, actuary, physician, and social reformer. He was a leading theorist on social insurance and one of the most influential writers on the subject. Rubinow had an M.D. from New York University Medical School and held a Ph.D. in economics from Columbia University. His 1913 book, Social Insurance, was the most influential early work on social security. His work impacted a generation of social reformers, including President Theodore Roosevelt, who used Rubinow's work in drafting the Progressive Party platform in 1912. The Progressive Party was the first of its kind to call for social insurance.

Rubinow was a Russian Jew who immigrated to the United States in 1893, at the age of 18. Attending Columbia University and New York University Medical School, he trained as a medical doctor. He grew so upset with the misery of his patients that he decided he could do more good for the common man by helping to alleviate their economic woes than he could as a physician.

Employed as an economic expert in the U.S. Department of Agriculture's Bureau of Statistics, Division of Foreign Markets, Rubinow wrote several extensive analyses of the development of the Russian wheat market and the impact of growing Russian wheat exports on U.S. and world markets.

Employed as an actuary, Rubinow was central to the formation of the Casualty Actuarial and Statistical Society of America in 1914, which is known today as the Casualty Actuarial Society. Rubinow was elected its first president. In 1916 he was elected as a Fellow of the American Statistical Association.

Rubinow's 1934 book, The Quest for Security, established him as the most recognized theorist on social insurance in the first three decades of the twentieth century.

Rubinow also authored a series of articles that appeared in the Journal of Political Economy, Journal of Home Economics, and Journal of Sociology on the so-called domestic service problem, and the difficulties that white middle-class women faced in finding an adequate supply of domestic servants. Rubinow argued that the reluctance and refusal of white native-born and immigrant women to enter domestic service reflected the feudal labor conditions that informed the occupation. In particular, Rubinow criticized mistresses for failing to open their homes to the same reforms that had been implemented in industrial workplace such as contracts, set hours, and other standardizations.

Dr. Rubinow married Sophie Himwich. Their son, Raymond S. Rubinow (1905–1996), was a noted New York civic leader. Their daughter, Olga Rubinow Lurie (1907–2004), was a child psychologist and specialist in the emotional health of children. Raymond Rubinow married Consuelo Kamholz (1909–1993).
