= Zillmerisation =

Zillmerisation relates to the valuation of a life insurance company by an actuary.

When new regular premium protection business (such as life or critical illness insurance) is written, the value of the company may reduce (when viewed on a regulatory basis) even if the business is likely to be profitable. This effect is known as new business strain and is due to the requirement for the insurer to hold day 1 capital reserves that are higher than the initial premium payments from customers. Zillmerisation is one method of adjusting a net premium valuation to ease this initial strain.

== History ==
This method was developed by August Zillmer (1831-1893) in Germany in the late 1800s, and described in an 1863 paper entitled "Beiträge zur Theorie der Prämien-Reserve bei Lebens-Versicherungs-Anstalten" ("Contributions to the Theory of Life Insurance Reserves").

== Calculation ==
The process of 'Zillmerisation', or 'applying a Zillmer adjustment' involves increasing the amount of future net premiums allowed for in the valuation. The amount of the increase is notionally applied to recoup the initial acquisition and administrative costs. Over time, the Zillmer asset is amortised as the initial expenses are effectively recouped.

More specifically when doing a net premium valuation, for an n-year policy taken at age x, t years into the policy, the reserve is $S\cdot~A_{x+t:\begin{smallmatrix}\hline~n-t|\end{smallmatrix}} - NP_{x:\begin{smallmatrix}\hline~n|\end{smallmatrix}} a_{x+t:\begin{smallmatrix}\hline~n-t|\end{smallmatrix}}$ which equals 0 at time t=0 (by definition of NP).

Where:

- S is the sum assured (face amount)
- A is an assurance function
- NP is the net premium for that sum assured
- a is an annuity function
- E (used in the Zillmer adjustment below) is the initial expenses

So the reserve is the present value of future benefits less the present value of future notional net premiums.

In applying a Zillmer adjustment, the net premium (NP) is increased by an amount $E/a_{x:\begin{smallmatrix}\hline~n|\end{smallmatrix}}$. This sets the reserve at time t=0 to -E, and over the expected lifetime of the policy the Zillmer reserve smoothly drops to zero. This in effect spreads the valuation impact of the initial expenses over the policy's lifetime instead of suffering the day 1 new business strain.

== Sprague adjustment ==
A variation on the Zillmer adjustment is the Sprague adjustment. If we assume the first year of premium is entirely used up in meeting the initial costs, we can write the reserve as $S\cdot~A_{x+t:\begin{smallmatrix}\hline~n-t|\end{smallmatrix}} - NP_{x+1:\begin{smallmatrix}\hline~n-1|\end{smallmatrix}} a_{x+t:\begin{smallmatrix}\hline~n-t|\end{smallmatrix}}$ (i.e. the present value of future benefits less the present value of a different notional net premium).

Since the adjusted net premium is larger, you are in effect subtracting a larger amount, producing a smaller reserve, and thus reducing the new business strain.
