= Ecology Building Society =

British financial institution

- Type: Building society (mutual)
- Industry: Banking and financial services
- Founded: 1981
- Headquarters: Silsden, England, UK
- Number of locations: 1
- Area served: United Kingdom
- Key people: Chair - Louise Pryor; Chief Executive - Gareth Griffiths; Chief Financial Officer - Chris White
- Products: Savings, mortgages
- Total assets: ▲£304 million (2022); £256 million (2021); GBP (December 2022)
- Members: ▲16,000 (December 2022)
- Number of employees: ▲45 (2022); 39 (2021); (December 2022)
- Website: www.ecology.co.uk

Ecology Building Society is a building society in the United Kingdom. It was established in 1981, is based in Silsden, England. The Ecology is a member of the Building Societies Association.

== History and purpose ==
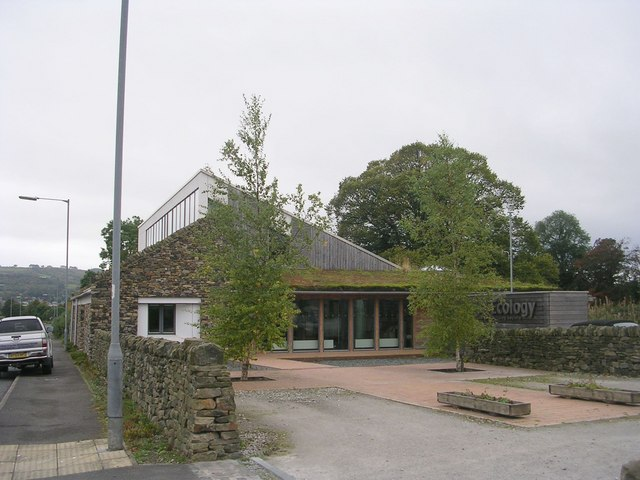
Ecology Building Society headquarters building

The society was established by an individual, David Pedley, who persuaded 10 people to contribute £500 each, to establish a society to provide mortgages for properties that respect the environment, in 1981.

In 2016, the Ecology Building Society was the first building society awarded the Fair Tax Mark.

== See also ==
- Ethical banking
