= Rakesh Sethi (banker) =

Indian banker

CMD of Allahabad Bank
- Incumbent
- Assumed office 13 March 2014
- Preceded by: Shubhalakshmi Panse

Personal details
- Education: Master of Commerce, Osmania University

Rakesh Sethi (Hindi: राकेश सेठी) is the former Chairman and Managing Director of Allahabad Bank. Prior to this, he was an executive director at Punjab National Bank. He joined Allahabad Bank in March, 2014 and served until 2017. He was preceded by Shubalakshmi Panse.

== Background ==
He started his banking career from Andhra Bank as an Officer in 1978. Rakesh Sethi in his 34 years of experience served as a National Banking Group General Manager at Bank of India, General Manager of Andhra Bank, Director of Andhra Bank (since 26 December 2008).

Rakesh Sethi was also the Chairman of the Board at JSC Subsidiary Bank Punjab National Bank Kazakhstan since 6 April 2012, An Executive Director of Union Bank of India since August 2013. He serves as a Nominee Director of India Factoring and Finance Solutions Pvt. Ltd. He served as an Executive Director of Punjab National Bank from 1 January 2011 to 11 March 2014. He served as a Non-Executive Director of PNB Gilts Ltd. from 24 October 2011 to 9 January 2013.
