= Institute of Actuaries of India =

Organization of India

Agency overview
- Type: National Apex Body
- Jurisdiction: Ministry of Finance, Government of India
- Headquarters: Navi Mumbai, Maharashtra
- Website: www.actuariesindia.org

The Institute of Actuaries of India is the sole national apex body for actuaries in India. It was formed in September 1944 by the conversion of the Actuarial Society of India into a body corporate by virtue of the Actuaries Act, 2006. It is under the ownership of Ministry of Finance, Government of India.

== Registration of the IAI ==
In 1979, it was admitted to the International Actuarial Association as a member.

On 14 December 1982, it was formally registered under Registration of Literary, Scientific and Charitable Societies Act XXI of 1960. A certificate of registration of the ASI under section XII AA of Income Tax Act was received on 14 March 1984. IAI is also registered under Public Charitable Trust Act 1950

== Educational and ethical goals ==
- To prepare "actuaries of tomorrow" who are adequately qualified and competent in the global context.
- To keep the level of competence on a continuing basis for fully qualified Actuaries at a high in the global context through CPD (Continuing Professional Development) and other programs.
- To serve the cause of public interest through Professional Code of Conduct and Disciplinary Procedures.

=== Objectives ===
- Advancement of the actuarial profession in India.
- Providing opportunities for interaction among members of the profession.
- Facilitating research, arranging lectures on relevant subjects.
- Providing facilities and guidance to those studying for the Actuarial exams.

== Placement ==
Till 2002, multinational reinsurers setting up service offices in India imported actuaries due to severe shortage of skills domestically. By 2005, an Indian actuary with at least 7 years of post-qualification experience was paid about US$40,000 in annual salary. The package rises to US$60,000 for an appointed actuary.

IAI is a statutory body established under The Actuaries Act 2006 (35 of 2006) for regulation of profession of Actuaries in India. The provisions of the said Act have come into force from 10thday of November 2006, in terms of the notification dated 8 November 2006, issued by the Government of India in the Ministry of Finance, Department of Economic Affairs. As a consequence of this, the erstwhile Actuarial Society of India was dissolved and all the Assets and Liabilities of the Actuarial Society of India were transferred to, and vested in, the Institute of Actuaries of India constituted under Section 3 of the Actuaries Act, 2006.

The erstwhile Actuarial Society of India (ASI) was established in September 1944. Since 1979, the ASI has been a Full Member of International Actuarial Association (an umbrella organizations to all actuarial bodies across the world) and is actively involved in its affairs. In 1982, the ASI was registered under Registration of Literary, Scientific and Charitable Societies Act XXI of 1860 and also under Bombay Public Charitable Trust Act, 1950. In 1989, the ASI started examinations up to Associate level, and in 1991, started conducting Fellowship level examination leading to professional qualification of an actuary, till then the accreditation was based on Institute of Actuaries, London examinations (now Institute and Faculty of Actuaries.).

The IAI has grown as well with around 9,182 student members joining the society. The current president of IAI is Preeti Chandrashekhar.

== Actuarial organizations ==
Actuaries usually belong to one or more professional bodies, often national in scope. A list may be found here: Category:Actuarial associations

== See also ==
- Actuary
- Actuarial present value
- Actuarial science
- Actuarial notation
- Catastrophe modeling
- Risk theory
