= New business strain =

For a life insurer and a newly set up non-life insurer, even if profitable business is written, the value of the company may appear to worsen (when viewed from a regulatory basis, for example) because of new business strain. This is a concept dealt with regularly by actuaries.

New business strain, or initial capital stain, occurs because the initial outgoings (such as commission, expenses, reserves, etc.) will take place when the policy is written, and thus have an immediate negative impact on the company's financial position. Over the life of the contract, future income (premiums, investment income, etc.) is expected to repay this initial outlay. However under some accounting regimes, the insurer may not take credit for such future surpluses.

The impact is thus an immediate hit to solvency and profitability when a policy is written, followed by surpluses in later years that pay this back.

New Business Strain is artificial in that it is a function of how a regulatory body, for example, might look at a life insurer's financial position. This tends not to be realistic, but instead conservative - because that is the role a regulator plays. Assuming its pricing assumptions are robust, a company's solvency and profitability actually increases when a new policy is written.

Depending on what reporting basis is being used, new business strain can be eased by the use of Zillmerisation or a Deferred acquisition cost asset. As a result, local GAAP accounting and IFRS accounting tends to show much lower levels of new business strain than regulatory accounting.
