= Filip Lundberg =

Swedish mathematician

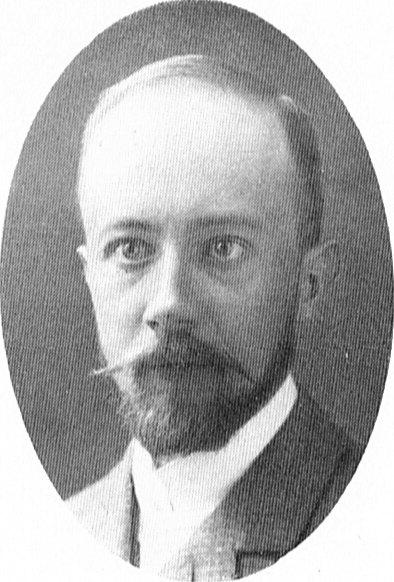
- Lundberg in 1926
- Born: 2 June 1876; Sweden
- Died: 31 December 1965 (aged 89); Sweden
- Education: University of Uppsala
- Known for: A founder of mathematical risk theory, ruin theory
- Scientific career
- Fields: Mathematics, Finance
- Workplaces: De Förenade, Lif-Victoria

Ernst Filip Oskar Lundberg (2 June 1876 – 31 December 1965) was a Swedish actuary, and mathematician. Lundberg is one of the founders of mathematical risk theory and worked as managing director of several insurance companies.

According to Harald Cramér, "Filip Lundberg's works on risk theory were all written at a time when no general theory of stochastic processes existed, and when collective reinsurance methods, in the present sense of the word, were entirely unknown to insurance companies. In both respects his ideas were far ahead of their time, and his works deserve to be generally recognized as pioneering works of fundamental importance."

== Biography ==
Born in 1876, Filip Lundberg's father, Philip Lundberg, was a school teacher in mathematics who died just three months after Lundberg was born. Filip's first ambition was to follow his father's career in mathematics. He studied mathematics at the University of Uppsala, graduating in 1896 and receiving his Licentiate in 1898. However, instead of becoming a teacher, Filip joined a newly founded insurance company. In 1903, Lundberg went on to defend his doctoral thesis on the probability and collective risk. He soon moved to a second company where he was appointed actuary and, at the age of 28, became its managing director. From 1904 to the 1930s, Lundberg's activities were divided between his everyday life and trying to understand the relationship between the concepts 'collective' and 'risk'. Lundberg's results are described in his academic publications between the years 1909 and 1930. His major works on the ruin problem were published in 1926 and 1928. From 1910 on, he was a leading voice in debates about the life insurance industry and a prolific writer and debater. Lundberg advocated a cautious approach to the insurance business which emphasized consolidation before expansion. Lundberg went on to become a leader of the industry, managing other companies, serving as chairman of the Association of Swedish Life Insurance Companies for ten years, and sitting on government committees on insurance. Filip Lundberg left his last position within Swedish insurance, as chairman of the board of Eir, in the same year that his collective risk theory was definitively clarified. Filip Lundberg died in 1965.

== Work ==
In parallel to his business career, Lundberg worked on a theory of collective risk. In 1903, he finished his doctoral thesis, Approximations of the Probability Function/Reinsurance of Collective Risks. This introduced the compound Poisson process and involved work on the central limit theorem. Cramér writes that the thesis has a reputation for being impossible to understand but, that looked at now, "one cannot help being struck by his ability to deal intuitively with concepts and methods that would have to wait another thirty years before being put on a rigorous foundation." Cramér mentions later work by Andrey Kolmogorov and William Feller but it was Cramér himself who developed Lundberg's ideas on risk and linked them to the emerging theory of stochastic processes.

Focardi & Fabozzi describes Lundberg's thesis as a milestone in actuarial mathematics. It was the first to define a collective theory of risk and to apply a sophisticated probabilistic formulation to the insurance ruin problem. Lundberg’s work anticipated many future developments of probability theory, including what was later to be known as the theory of point processes. Lundberg's theory, together with that of French mathematician Louis Bachelier, was ahead of its time and inspired the subsequent development of probability theory. But the type of mathematics implied by his work could not be employed completely until the development of digital computers.

Because he published many of his major works in Swedish, Lundberg's work went unnoticed by the actuarial community for nearly 30 years. However, eventually Lundberg's ideas became known largely through the work of Cramér and his students. Although Lundberg published some work in German, the international scientific language of the time, Lundberg's thesis and most of his subsequent writings were in Swedish. His mathematical language did not travel easily, either.

== Discussions ==
- Cramér, H. (1969). "Historical review of Filip Lundberg's works on risk theory". Scandinavian Actuarial Journal. 1969: 6–9. doi:10.1080/03461238.1969.10404602.
- K. Englund and A. Martin-Löf (2001) Ernst Filip Oskar Lundberg, Statisticians of the Centuries (ed. C. C. Heyde and E. Seneta) pp. 308–311. New York: Springer.
- Focardi, Sergio M. & Fabozzi, Frank J. (2004). The Mathematics of Financial Modeling and Investment Management, pp. 80–81. Hoboken, New Jersey: John Wiley & Sons.
- Å. Grenholm et al. (1969). Filip Lundberg: Förgrundsman i svensk livförsäkring.

== See also ==
- Ruin theory
- Harald Cramer
- Louis Bachelier
