= Institute and Faculty of Actuaries =

UK professional body

- Abbreviation: IFoA
- Formation: 1 August 2010; 16 years ago
- Type: Chartered professional body
- Headquarters: London, United Kingdom
- Region served: Worldwide
- Members: 34,000+ (2025)
- President: Paul Sweeting
- Chief executive: Paul Lewis
- Website: actuaries.org.uk

The Institute and Faculty of Actuaries (IFoA) is the United Kingdom's chartered professional body for actuaries. It represents and regulates more than 34,000 members worldwide and works internationally through offices in London, Oxford and Edinburgh and regional offices in Beijing, Malaysia and Singapore. The profession is overseen in the UK by the Financial Reporting Council (FRC), which sets technical actuarial standards and monitors the IFoA's regulation of actuaries. The IFoA was created in 2010 by the merger of the Institute of Actuaries (founded 1848) and the Faculty of Actuaries (founded 1856). In November 2024 the IFoA introduced the Chartered Actuary designation for Fellow and Associate members.

== History ==
The IFoA came into being on 1 August 2010 following the merger of the Institute of Actuaries and the Faculty of Actuaries in Scotland. The merger was implemented by amendments to the Institute's Royal Charter and accompanying governance documents, with the combined body assuming the assets and liabilities of the former organisations.

== Structure and governance ==
The IFoA is incorporated by Royal Charter and governed by a Council which delegates to a board and a system of policy and regulatory committees.

Regulatory oversight is split between the profession and the UK's Financial Reporting Council (FRC). The FRC sets and maintains technical actuarial standards and oversees the IFoA's regulation of actuaries, including through its Actuarial Monitoring Programme. The IFoA's regulatory board includes a significant proportion of lay (non-actuary) members.

The IFoA Foundation is the profession's registered charity, supporting scholarships, mentoring and widening participation initiatives in the UK and internationally.

== President ==
As of July 2025, the president of the Institute and Faculty of Actuaries is Paul Sweeting, who began a two-year term in July 2025, succeeding Kartina Tahir Thomson.

== Recent past presidents ==
- 2010–11: Ronnie Bowie
- 2011–12: Jane Curtis
- 2012–13: Philip Scott
- 2013–14: David Hare
- 2014–15: Nick Salter
- 2015–16: Fiona Morrison
- 2016–17: Colin Wilson
- 2017–18: Marjorie Ngwenya
- 2018–19: Jules Constantinou
- 2019–20: John Taylor
- 2020–21: Tan Suee Chieh
- 2021–22: Louise Pryor
- 2022–23: Matt Saker
- 2023–24: Kalpana Shah
- 2024–25: Kartina Tahir Thomson

== Research and data ==
The IFoA supports the Continuous Mortality Investigation (CMI), which provides mortality and morbidity experience analyses and practical tools widely used by actuaries. The CMI Mortality Projections Model is updated regularly; Working Paper 201 introduced CMI_2024 in June 2025, calibrated to population data to 31 December 2024. The CMI also publishes regular mortality monitors for England and Wales and periodic updates on recent experience.

The IFoA’s research and thought-leadership activity has been repositioned in recent years, with the Actuarial Research Centre (ARC) closed and resources focused on member-led and industry-collaboration projects.

== Regulation and standards ==
All members are bound by the Actuaries’ Code, which sets core professional principles. Version 3.2 of the Code took effect on 25 September 2025, accompanied by updated guidance.

Within the UK geographic scope, members must also comply with the FRC’s Technical Actuarial Standards (TASs), including TAS 100 (General) and the relevant Specific TASs (for example TAS 200: Insurance; TAS 300: Pensions; TAS 400: Funeral Plans).

The IFoA operates the Quality Assurance Scheme (QAS) for organisations employing actuaries; as at 31 October 2024 there were 42 accredited organisations, with additional firms covered by the QAS CPD scheme. It also acts as a Designated Professional Body under Part XX of the Financial Services and Markets Act 2000, licensing firms for certain exempt regulated activities.

== Education and qualifications ==
The IFoA’s qualification structure (introduced with Curriculum 2019) comprises Core Principles (CS1–CS2, CM1–CM2, CB1–CB3), Core Practices (CP1–CP3), Specialist Principles (SP) and Specialist Advanced (SA) subjects. Personal and Professional Development (PPD) and professional skills training are also required.

Since 2019 new students normally qualify first as Associates before progressing to Fellowship, aligning Associateship with international standards. University accreditation and exemptions are available through recognised programmes.

In 2024 the IFoA introduced the Chartered Actuary designation for Fellows and Associates; members can adopt the designation after meeting the eligibility criteria and remain subject to IFoA standards.

== Membership ==
The IFoA reports a global membership of more than 34,000 actuaries and students. In 2024 the IFoA established new member committees in Greater China and the Middle East to support regional engagement.

== Public policy and scrutiny ==
Following government reviews of audit and actuarial oversight, the UK Government confirmed in 2022 its intention to place the FRC’s oversight and regulation of the actuarial profession on a statutory footing as part of wider reforms (with the proposed Audit, Reporting and Governance Authority). The FRC’s monitoring and standard-setting activities for actuarial work continue alongside the IFoA’s own regulatory programme.

In the wake of gilt-market stress in September–October 2022, commentators and parliamentary committees examined the role of liability-driven investment (LDI) strategies used by UK defined benefit schemes. Correspondence from the Bank of England described vulnerabilities and emergency measures taken during the period, and House of Lords committees took evidence on LDI oversight and market structure. A range of views on lessons for actuaries and pension governance were expressed at the time, including in letters to the editor of national media.

== Publications and media ==
The IFoA has an award-winning membership magazine, The Actuary, and a corresponding website, published on behalf of the IFoA by Redactive Media Group. Its origins lie in an amateur newsletter called Fiasco (a play on the actuarial qualification post-nominals FIA), which was produced by a group of student actuaries from 1978 to 1990. This then evolved into The Actuary printed magazine, which marked its 30 year anniversary with the December 2020 issue. In September 2024, it changed its frequency from monthly to bimonthly, and introduced a regular podcast (The Actuary Podcast) and a series of short videos on topics relevant to actuarial science. Most of The Actuary's contributors are from the actuarial profession, giving it its 'by actuaries, for actuaries' ethos, and its content is shaped by a team of actuaries, including one in the role of editor, who serves a two-year term. The Actuary has an online archive, a jobs board and a social media presence.

== See also ==
- Actuarial science
- Actuary
- British Actuarial Journal
- Casualty Actuarial Society
- Chartered Enterprise Risk Analyst
- Institute of Actuaries of India
- International Actuarial Association
- Society of Actuaries
