= Casualty Actuarial Society =

North American professional society

- Casualty Actuarial Society logo
- Formation: November 7, 1914 (111 years ago)
- Type: Professional body
- Headquarters: Arlington, VA
- Location: United States
- Members: 10,840 as of 2024
- Official language: English
- President: Barry Franklin
- President-Elect: Kathleen C. Odomirok
- Website: http://www.casact.org/

The Casualty Actuarial Society (CAS) is a leading international professional society of actuaries, based in North America, and specializing in property and casualty insurance.

There are three classes of CAS membership: Associate (ACAS), Fellow (FCAS), and Affiliate. Requirements for the first two classes include a comprehensive series of exams. Topics covered in the exams include statistics, mathematics, finance, economics, insurance, enterprise risk management, and actuarial science. The third class of CAS membership, Affiliate, includes qualified actuaries who practice in property-casualty insurance but do not meet the qualifications to become an Associate or Fellow.

== History ==
The society was founded in 1914 and originally named the Casualty Actuarial and Statistical Society. The present name was adopted in 1921. The society's first president was I. M. Rubinow, who played a key role in its formation. There were 97 founding members of the society.

The CAS was at first primarily concerned with problems of workers compensation insurance, which was introduced in the U.S. in the early 20th century. Eventually members of the society worked on all types of property-casualty insurance, including coverages for automobiles, homes and businesses. As of November 2024, the society has over 10,000 members. Although the majority of members live and practice in the United States, as of 2026 there are CAS members in almost 50 countries around the world.

Members of the CAS are employed by insurance companies, reinsurance companies, insurance brokers, educational institutions, ratemaking organizations, state insurance departments, the federal government, independent consulting firms, and non-traditional employers. There are a number of regional affiliates of the CAS, along with several special interest sections. As of August 2023, there are 6,676 Fellows, 3,340 Associates, and 33 Affiliate members of CAS.

== Education system ==
The CAS requires all candidates to qualify through a series of actuarial exams covering various aspects of actuarial practice. Passing Exams 1–6 as well as Exam S, the Course on Professionalism, the Validation by Educational Experience (VEE), and two online courses qualifies an actuary for the Associateship designation; passing three additional exams is required to become a Fellow. The exams usually take a long time to complete, often near a decade, due to the low pass rates and the difficulty of the syllabus material.

A number of the earlier exams are conducted jointly with the Society of Actuaries (SOA), and relatively few actuaries have qualified as members of both the CAS and the SOA.

The subject matter covered in the VEE and each of the nine other CAS components is as follows:

=== Preliminary exams ===
The first four actuarial exam requirements, known as "Preliminary Exams" consist largely of core mathematics related to actuarial science including probability, statistics, interest theory, and risk models. Exams 1 and 2 (known to the SOA as Exams P and FM) are common to both the SOA and the CAS. This joint sponsorship allows students to work on some of the initial requirements before they choose a specific discipline to pursue. The syllabus has a tendency to be adjusted regularly, which makes comparing exams from different 5-year blocks somewhat difficult.

CAS Exam	Subject Matter	Notes
Exam 1	Probability	Interchangeable with SOA Exam P
Exam 2	Financial Mathematics	Interchangeable with SOA Exam FM
Exam MAS-I	Modern Actuarial Statistics-I	
Exam MAS-II	Modern Actuarial Statistics-II	

2000 Syllabus	2005 Syllabus	2008 Syllabus	2014 Syllabus	2015 Syllabus	2018 Syllabus	2023 Syllabus
Exam 1 SOA Course 1 (Mathematical Foundations of Actuarial Science)	Exam 1 SOA Exam P (Probability)	Exam 1 SOA Exam P (Probability)	Exam 1 SOA Exam P (Probability)	Exam 1 SOA Exam P (Probability)	Exam 1 SOA Exam P (Probability)	Exam 1 SOA Exam P
Exam 2 SOA Course 2 (Interest Theory, Economics and Finance)	Exam 2 SOA Exam FM (Financial Mathematics)	Exam 2 SOA Exam FM (Financial Mathematics)	Exam 2 SOA Exam FM (Financial Mathematics)	Exam 2 SOA Exam FM (Financial Mathematics)	Exam 2 SOA Exam FM (Financial Mathematics)	Exam 2 SOA Exam FM
Exam 3 SOA Course 3 (Actuarial Models)	Exam 3 (Statistics and Actuarial Models)	Exam 3F; SOA Exam MFE (Models for Financial Economics)	Exam 3F; SOA Exam MFE (Models for Financial Economics)	Exam 3F; SOA Exam MFE (Models for Financial Economics)	Exam 3F; SOA Exam IFM (Investment and Financial Markets)	—N/a
Exam 3 SOA Course 3 (Actuarial Models)	Exam 3 (Statistics and Actuarial Models)	Exam 3L (Models for Life Contingencies and Statistics)	Exam LC (Models for Life Contingencies)	Exam S (Statistics and Probabilistic Models)	Exam MAS-I (Modern Actuarial Statistics-I)	Exam MAS-I
Exam 3 SOA Course 3 (Actuarial Models)	Exam 3 (Statistics and Actuarial Models)	Exam 3L (Models for Life Contingencies and Statistics)	Exam ST (Models for Stochastic Processes and Statistics)	Exam S (Statistics and Probabilistic Models)	Exam MAS-I (Modern Actuarial Statistics-I)	Exam MAS-I
Exam 4 SOA Course 4 (Actuarial Modeling)	Exam 4 SOA Exam C (Construction and Evaluation of Actuarial Models)	Exam 4 SOA Exam C (Construction and Evaluation of Actuarial Models)	Exam 4 SOA Exam C (Construction and Evaluation of Actuarial Models)	Exam 4 SOA Exam C (Construction and Evaluation of Actuarial Models)	Exam MAS-II (Modern Actuarial Statistics-II)	Exam MAS-II

=== Other components toward associateship ===
In addition to preliminary exams, the candidate needs to complete the Validation by Educational Experience (VEE) and Data Insurance Series Courses to achieve the credential of Associate of Casualty Actuarial Society (ACAS).

Code	Subject Matter	Notes
VEE Acct Fin	Accounting and finance	
VEE Econ	Economics	
DISC RM	Risk Management and Insurance Operations	Administered by The Institutes (Course CA1)
DISC IA	Insurance Accounting, Coverage Analysis, Insurance Law, and Insurance Regulation	Administered by The Institutes (Course CA2)
DISC DA	Introduction to Data and Analytics	Administered by The Institutes
Exam 5	Basic Techniques for Ratemaking and Estimating Claim Liabilities	
Exam 6	Regulation and Financial Reporting	Nation-Specific Examination: Canada, International, Taiwan, United States

=== Fellowship exams ===
Three additional exams are required to achieve the credential of Fellow of Casualty Actuarial Society (FCAS).

CAS Exam	Subject Matter	Notes
Exam 7	Estimation of Policy Liabilities, Insurance Company Valuation, and Enterprise Risk Management	
Exam 8	Advanced Ratemaking	
Exam 9	Financial Risk and Rate of Return	

== Publications and research ==
The society's members publish a large number of research papers on various aspects of property-casualty actuarial science. The society's oldest and most prestigious research publication was the annual Proceedings of the Casualty Actuarial Society which was published from 1914–2005. In 2006 the Proceedings no longer contained research papers but only administrative material in combination with the Society's Yearbook. Peer-reviewed research is now published in Variance which focuses on both practical and theoretical research in non-life actuarial science and related areas in the science of risk. Variance's current lead editors are Dr. Peng Shi (University of Wisconsin–Madison) and Avraham Adler. Non-peer reviewed research is published in the CAS E-Forum. The society also publishes various research reports which are used throughout the insurance industry such as ones on Disruptive Technologies and bias.

== Meetings and administrative structure ==
The society holds two general meetings each year for the presentation of research papers and discussions about actuarial topics. Several other meetings, specializing in topics such as ratemaking, predictive modeling, loss reserving, or reinsurance are offered each year, along with a series of limited attendance seminars. Each of the regional affiliates also holds regular meetings.

Many members of the CAS are also members of the American Academy of Actuaries, the U.S. umbrella group for actuaries of all specialties.

The governing body of the society is the 15-member board of directors, elected by members who hold the Fellowship designation. The administration of the society is conducted by a President elected by the Fellows and seven board-elected Vice-Presidents responsible for administration, admissions, international activities, marketing and communications, professional education, research and development, and risk integration and enterprise risk management. These elected officials oversee a large number of task forces and committees composed of society members and others. The largest single committee is the Examination Committee, consisting of more than three hundred society members, who are responsible for writing and grading the CAS actuarial exams.

== Controversies ==
=== Rescinding of CAS Statements of Principles ===
In December 2020, the CAS Board of Directors voted unanimously to rescind three CAS Statements of Principles. This action by the CAS Board caused a prompt backlash from CAS stakeholders for whom this presented significant problems, including CAS Members, regulatory agencies, and consumer groups. In response, the CAS Board voted to reinstate the Ratemaking Statement of Principles in May 2021.

== See also ==
- American Academy of Actuaries
- Society of Actuaries
- List of learned societies
