= Robert J. Myers =

American actuary (1912–2010)

Robert Julius Myers (October 31, 1912 – February 13, 2010) was an American actuary who co-created the American Social Security program. He also set the retirement age in the United States at 65 years old.

Myers was born in Lancaster, Pennsylvania, on October 31, 1912, to parents, Laurence B. Myers and Edith Hirsh Myers. He received his bachelor's degree from Lehigh University. In 1963 he was elected as a Fellow of the American Statistical Association.

Myers died from respiratory failure at his home in Silver Spring, Maryland, at the age of 97.
