= Society of Actuaries =

Actuary organization

- Society of Actuaries logo
- Abbreviation: SOA
- Formation: 1949
- Type: Professional association
- Headquarters: Chicago, Illinois
- Location: United States
- Members: 33,512 in 2023
- Official language: English
- CEO: Clar Rosso
- Website: soa.org

The Society of Actuaries (SOA) is a global professional organization for actuaries. It was founded in 1949 as the merger of two major actuarial organizations in the United States: the Actuarial Society of America and the American Institute of Actuaries. It is a full member organization of the International Actuarial Association.

Through education and research, the SOA promotes actuaries as leaders in the assessment and management of risk to enhance financial outcomes for individuals, organizations, and the public. The SOA's vision is for actuaries to be highly sought-after professionals who develop and communicate solutions for complex financial issues. The SOA provides primary and continuing education for students and practicing actuaries, maintains high professional standards for actuaries, and conducts research on actuarial trends and public policy issues.

As a global organization, the SOA represents actuaries from all major areas of practice, including life and health insurance, retirement and pensions, investment and finance, enterprise risk management, and general insurance (property and casualty) insurance. The Casualty Actuarial Society also represents actuaries working with property and casualty.

== History ==
The Society was founded as a merger of two major American actuarial associations, as reflected in its logo: the Actuarial Society of America and the American Institute of Actuaries.

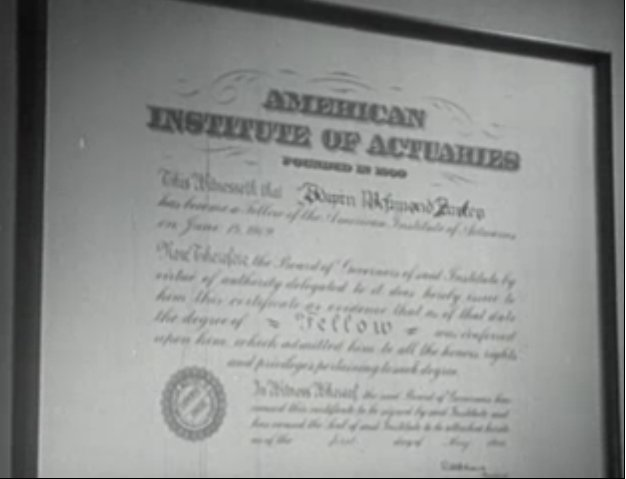
A diploma issued by the American Institute of Actuaries

The Actuarial Society of America was the first actuarial professional association in North America, founded in 1889 with only 38 members and headquartered in New York City. Initial members were included by invitation, but the organization soon adopted a system of examination for qualification, with the first Fellow to qualify via exams joining in 1900.

The American Institute of Actuaries was founded in 1909. Based in Chicago, it attracted members from life insurance companies in the midwestern and southern United States. The formation of the American Institute of Actuaries, which (like the Actuarial Society of America) was geared toward actuaries in the field of life insurance, was followed within the decade by the creation of two other specialized actuarial organizations: the Casualty Actuarial Society, which still exists today, and the Fraternal Actuarial Association, which dissolved in 1980.

Between the two organizations, which came to have some overlap in membership, the number of recognized professional actuaries climbed from the initial 38 to over 1,000 by the time the two organizations merged in 1949 to form the SOA. The SOA has seen continued growth since then, now recognizing over 30,000 professional actuaries as active members.

The SOA, along with its public relations firm Golin, won the PRWeek Corporate Branding Campaign of the Year award for 2008. The award was given for the SOA's efforts to revitalize the actuarial profession's brand in the U.S., including the slogan "Risk is Opportunity. In 2024, the SOA moved its headquarters to Chicago, Illinois.

== Structure ==
=== Leadership ===
The SOA is headed by a board of directors, consisting of a president, president-elect, past president, and fifteen other board members. The employees of the SOA are headed by the chief executive officer, a salaried position appointed by the board of directors.

=== Elections ===
The board positions are filled by election. A member is eligible to vote in board elections if they are an FSA, or if they have been an ASA for at least five years. Only FSAs can be elected to the board.

The SOA holds its elections annually in late summer or early fall for its board of directors and the Section Councils. In the board of directors election, one president-elect, and five elected board members are elected. Elected board members serve three-year terms. The president-elect serves three one-year terms as president-elect, president, and past president.

In section elections, generally one-third of the council is elected each year as members serve three-year terms. Section councils select their officers (chair, vice chair, and secretary/treasurer).

According to the Section Bylaws, all members of a Section are entitled to vote in the Section Council election. This includes ASAs, FSAs, and members of co-sponsoring organizations who are also members of a Section. SOA members are emailed login credentials to vote online. Members without valid email addresses, or who notify the SOA of their request, receive paper ballots.

=== Membership ===
The SOA has more than 30,000 actuaries as members. The society's members are involved in the life, health, pension, and general insurance areas of the actuarial profession. There are three classes of members.

Level	Requirements
Fellow	Achieved designation "Fellow of the Society of Actuaries" (FSA)
Associate	Achieved designation "Associate of the Society of Actuaries" (ASA)
Affiliate	Anyone with an interest in the actuarial field

There are two designations offered by the SOA: the "Associate of Society of Actuaries" (ASA) and the "Fellow of the Society of Actuaries" (FSA). The SOA also issues one credential: the "Chartered Enterprise Risk Analyst" (CERA), which was introduced in 2007. Three micro-credentials (Pre-Actuarial Foundations, Actuarial Science Foundations, and Data Science for Actuaries) were introduced in 2022 along with affiliate membership.

Requirements for membership for the SOA include writing actuarial exams, a comprehensive series of competitive exams. Topics covered in the exams include mathematics, finance, insurance, economics, interest theory, life models, and actuarial science. Non-members working in the actuarial profession and taking exams are often referred to as actuarial students or candidates.

Members of the SOA who meet a professional experience requirement are eligible for membership in the American Academy of Actuaries, which represents United States actuaries from all practice areas.

== Education system ==
Professional designations of ASA or FSA are earned by completing a rigorous education system including examinations, courses, and e-learning modules. It is common for actuarial students to work full-time in the profession while studying for the exams.

=== Exams towards associateship ===
The associateship exams, commonly called preliminary exams, consist mostly of core mathematics related to actuarial science including probability, interest theory, life contingencies, risk models, statistical modeling, and predictive analytics.

Current associateship exam requirements
Exam code	Exam title	Format	Length in hours	Sittings per year	Instantaneous results
P	Probability	Multiple-choice	3	6	Yes
FM	Financial Mathematics	Multiple-choice	2.5	6	Yes
FAM	Fundamentals of Actuarial Mathematics	Multiple-choice	3.5	3	Yes
SRM	Statistics for Risk Modeling	Multiple-choice	3.5	3	Yes
ALTAM or ASTAM	Advanced Long-Term / Short-Term Actuarial Mathematics	Written-answer	3	2	No
PA	Predictive Analytics	Written-answer	3.5	2	No
Note: Candidates only need one of ALTAM or ASTAM.

Preliminary exams are administered on computers at Prometric testing centers. The scores are reported on a scale of 0 to 10. The score is relative to the actual passing percentage $P$.

Exam scoring system
Result	Fail						Pass				
Score	0	1	2	3	4	5	6	7	8	9	10
Range	<0.5P	0.5P–0.6P	0.6P–0.7P	0.7P–0.8P	0.8P–0.9P	0.9P–P	P–1.1P	1.1P–1.2P	1.2P–1.3P	1.3P–1.4P	>1.4P

The highest achievable grade for some exams can be 9. If $P>\frac{100}{1.4}\% \approx 71.4\%$, then $1.4P > 100\%$, i.e. the requirement for a score of 10 is higher than $100\%$.

The current form of preliminary exams were established in year 2000 and have evolved over time. In 2018 and 2023, the preliminary exams have undergone another wave of significant changes to reflect an emphasis on predictive analytics, and also provides a curriculum balance between long-term and short-term insurance coverages. The rough equivalent of preliminary exams since year 2000 are listed according to the transition rules published by SOA. There are also differences in detail between exam syllabi over time.

Historical progression of associateship exams
2000 syllabus	2005 syllabus	2007 syllabus	2018 syllabus	2023 syllabus
Course 1 (Mathematical Foundations of Actuarial Science)	Exam P (Probability)	Exam P	Exam P	Exam P
Course 2 (Interest Theory, Economics and Finance)	Exam FM (Financial Mathematics)	Exam FM	Exam FM	Exam FM
Course 3 (Actuarial Models)	Exam M (Actuarial Models)	Exam MFE (Models for Financial Economics)	Exam IFM (Investment and Financial Markets)	—N/a
Course 3 (Actuarial Models)	Exam M (Actuarial Models)	Exam MLC (Models for Life Contingencies)	Exam LTAM (Long-Term Actuarial Mathematics)	Exam FAM; Exam ALTAM; Exam ASTAM
Course 4 (Actuarial Modeling)	Exam C (Construction and Evaluation of Actuarial Models)	Exam C	Exam STAM (Short-Term Actuarial Mathematics)	Exam FAM; Exam ALTAM; Exam ASTAM
—N/a	—N/a	—N/a	Exam SRM (Statistics for Risk Modeling)	Exam SRM
—N/a	—N/a	—N/a	Exam PA (Predictive Analytics)	Exam PA

=== Other components toward associateship ===
In addition to the exams, candidates also need to complete Validation by Educational Experience (VEE), a series of e-learning modules, and the Associateship Professionalism Course (APC).

Current other components toward associateship
Module code	Module title	Format
VEE Econ	Economics	University/college courses
VEE Acct Fin	Accounting and Finance	University/college courses
VEE Math Stat	Mathematical Statistics	University/college courses
PAF	Pre-Actuarial Foundations	e-learning module
ASF	Actuarial Science Foundations	e-learning module
ATPA	Advanced Topics in Predictive Analytics	e-learning module and a final assessment
FAP	Fundamentals of Actuarial Practice	e-learning course with five modules and a final assessment
APC	Associateship Professionalism Course	Virtual or in-person

In 2000, candidates may be admitted to associateship by completing Course 5 (Application of Basic Actuarial Principles), Course 6 (Finance and Investments), and APC in addition to the preliminary exams.

In 2005, the SOA introduced the VEE as the additional topics covered by actuarial education in addition to exams. The 3 VEE subjects were: applied statistical methods, corporate finance, and economics. The introduction of VEE also decreased the scope of preliminary exams. As a part of their education pathways reform, the SOA temporarily admitted candidates to associateship if they completed 2 courses from Course 5, 6, 7, 8, and Professional Development Requirement (PD). Note that Course 7 (Applied Actuarial Modeling), Course 8 (Advanced Specialized Actuarial Practice), and PD were part of the fellowship requirement.

In 2007, the Fundamentals of Actuarial Practice (FAP) were introduced to cover real-world topics such as insurance and professionalism with readings, case studies, and projects. The FAP modules superseded the former Course 5 (Application of Basic Actuarial Principles) and Course 7 (Applied Modeling). The FAP, which contained eight modules and two assessments, became the only option to attain associateship effective January 2007.

In 2018, the VEE subjects were amended to accounting and finance, economics, and mathematical statistics as part of the SOA's preliminary exams reform.

In 2023, more e-learning modules were added to the education requirement as a part of educational pathway redesign, including the Pre-Actuarial Foundations (PAF), Actuarial Science Foundations (ASF), and Advanced Topics in Predictive Analytics (ATPA). The FAP has been reduced to five modules with one final assessment.

Historical progression of other associateship components
2000 syllabus	2005 syllabus	2007 syllabus	2018 syllabus	2023 syllabus
—N/a	VEE Econ (Economics)	VEE Econ	VEE Econ	VEE Econ
—N/a	VEE Corp Fin (Corporate Finance)	VEE Corp Fin	VEE Acct Fin (Accounting and Finance)	VEE Acct Fin
—N/a	VEE App Stat (Applied Statistical Methods)	VEE App Stat	VEE Math Stat (Mathematical Statistics)	VEE Math Stat
Course 5 (Application of Basic Actuarial Principles)	Any 2 of: Courses 5, 6, 7, 8 and PD	FAP (Fundamentals of Actuarial Practice)	FAP	PAF (Pre-Actuarial Foundations); ASF (Actuarial Science Foundations); FAP
Course 6 (Finance and Investments)	Any 2 of: Courses 5, 6, 7, 8 and PD	—N/a	—N/a	—N/a
—N/a	—N/a	—N/a	—N/a	ATPA (Advanced Topics in Predictive Analytics)
APC (Associateship Professionalism Course)	APC	APC	APC	APC

=== Fellowship exams and components ===
Upper-level exam topics for the FSA designation include plan design, risk classification, enterprise risk management, ratemaking, and valuation. Four fellowship exams are taken, two of which are taken in one of six specialization tracks chosen by the candidate: Corporate Finance & Enterprise Risk Management (CFE), Investments (INV), Individual Life Insurance & Annuities (ILA), Retirement Benefits (RET), Group & Health Insurance (GH), or General Insurance (GI), while the other two are allowed to be taken from any track. The SOA updated the Fellowship tracks in 2018, 2023, and 2025.

In addition to the exams, candidates also need to complete the Decision Making and Communication (DMAC) module and the virtual or in-person Fellowship Admissions Course (FAC).

== See also ==
- American Academy of Actuaries
- Casualty Actuarial Society
- List of learned societies
