= American Academy of Actuaries =

Professional association for actuaries

- Abbreviation: the Academy
- Formation: 1965
- Type: Professional association
- Purpose: Serve the public on behalf of the United States actuarial profession.
- Headquarters: Washington, DC
- Region served: United States of America
- Official language: English
- President: Patricia Matson
- Main organ: Board of Directors
- Website: Official website

The American Academy of Actuaries, also known as the Academy, is the body that represents and unites United States actuaries in all practice areas. Established in 1965, the Academy serves as the profession's voice on public policy and professionalism issues.

== Standards ==
In 1988, the Academy created the Actuarial Standards Board (ASB) as an independent entity, supported by AAA staff. The ASB serves as the single board promulgating standards of practice for the entire actuarial profession in the United States. The ASB was given sole authority to develop, obtain comment upon, revise, and adopt standards of practice for the actuarial profession.

== Membership requirements ==
In order to sign statements of actuarial opinion, an American actuary must be a Member, American Academy of Actuaries (M.A.A.A.).

On January 1, 2026, the Academy’s Board adopted the following requirements for admission of new members to the American Academy of Actuaries.

Part A—Education / Basic Education

Compliance with the Competency Framework, which includes baseline knowledge of key actuarial competencies, U.S. laws and practices, and U.S. actuarial professionalism, and Achievement of an actuarial credential from an actuarial organization, both of which are recognized by the Academy.

Part B—Experience

Three years of responsible actuarial experience, including at least one year of responsible U.S. actuarial experience.

For purposes of this requirement, responsible actuarial experience is defined as work that requires knowledge and skill in solving actuarial problems.

== Actuarial Board for Counseling and Discipline ==
The Actuarial Board for Counseling and Discipline (ABCD) was formed to serve the Academy and all other U.S. actuarial organizations. The ABCD considers complaints and questions concerning possible violations of the Code(s) of Professional Conduct. In addition, the ABCD responds to inquiries by actuaries concerning their professional conduct and, when requested to do so, provides guidance in professional matters. The ABCD can recommend disciplinary actions for a member of one of the actuarial societies.

== Public policy activities ==
The Academy has published a number of issue briefs and monographs addressing public policy issues from an actuarial point of view. Because the Academy is non-partisan, it avoids taking specific policy positions in these publications. Most tend to discuss the fiscal and economic considerations as seen by actuaries. In many cases several policy alternatives are discussed, and advantages and disadvantages identified for each. In some cases the Academy provides formal written or oral testimony to Congress or other governmental bodies. The Academy is often asked by the National Association of Insurance Commissioners (NAIC) to provide input on actuarial issues, and has provided the NAIC with a number of reports and statements. On occasion, the Academy has submitted amicus briefs on court cases that are of interest to the actuarial profession. Less formal comment letters and other explanatory materials have been provided to a number of external audiences.

== Magazine ==
The Academy publishes Contingencies magazine, a bimonthly publication that publishes articles on a wide range of issues related to the actuarial profession.
