= Actuary =

Analyst of business risk and uncertainty

- Damage from Hurricane Katrina in 2005. Actuaries need to estimate long-term levels of such damage in order to accurately price property insurance, set appropriate reserves, and design appropriate reinsurance and capital management strategies.

Occupation
- Names: Actuary
- Occupation type: Profession; statistician; mathematician
- Activity sectors: Insurance; reinsurance; pension plans; social welfare programs

Description
- Competencies: Mathematics; statistics; finance; analytical skills; business knowledge
- Education required: See Credentialing and exams
- Fields of employment: insurance companies; insurance brokers; superannuation funds; consulting firms; government
- Related jobs: Underwriter

An actuary is a professional with advanced mathematical skills who deals with the measurement and management of risk and uncertainty. These risks can affect both sides of the balance sheet and require asset management, liability management, and valuation skills. Actuaries provide assessments of financial security systems, with a focus on their complexity, their mathematics, and their mechanisms. The name of the corresponding academic discipline is actuarial science.

While the concept of insurance dates to antiquity, the concepts needed to scientifically measure and mitigate risks have their origins in 17th-century studies of probability and annuities. Actuaries in the 21st century require analytical skills, business knowledge, and an understanding of human behavior and information systems; actuaries use this knowledge to design programs that manage risk, by determining if the implementation of strategies proposed for mitigating potential risks does not exceed the expected cost of those risks actualized. The steps needed to become an actuary, including education and licensing, are specific to a given country, with various additional requirements applied by regional administrative units; however, almost all processes impart universal principles of risk assessment, statistical analysis, and risk mitigation, involving rigorously structured training and examination schedules, taking many years to complete.

The profession has consistently been ranked as one of the most desirable. In various studies in the United States, being an actuary has been ranked first or second multiple times since 2010.

== Responsibilities ==
Actuaries use skills primarily in mathematics—particularly calculus-based probability and mathematical statistics—but also economics, computer science, finance, and business. For this reason, actuaries are essential to several sectors:

- to the insurance and reinsurance industries, either as staff employees or as consultants;
- to other businesses, including sponsors of pension plans;
- and to government agencies such as the Government Actuary's Department in the United Kingdom or the Social Security Administration in the United States.

Actuaries assemble and analyze data to estimate the probability and likely cost of an event such as death, sickness, injury, disability, or property loss. Actuaries also answer financial questions: these questions include the level of pension contributions needed to produce a certain retirement income, and how a company should invest resources to maximize the return on investment in light of potential risk. Using broad knowledge, actuaries help to design and price insurance policies, pension plans, and other financial strategies so as to ensure that the plans are maintained on a sound financial basis.

=== Disciplines ===
Most traditional actuarial disciplines fall into two main categories: life and non-life.

Life actuaries, who include health and pension actuaries, primarily deal with three kinds of risk: mortality, morbidity, and investment. Products prominent in their work include life insurance, annuities, pensions, short and long term disability insurance, health insurance, health savings accounts, and long-term care insurance. In addition to actuarial risks, social insurance programs are influenced by public opinion, politics, budget constraints, changing demographics, and other factors such as medical technology, inflation, and cost of living considerations.

Non-life actuaries, also known as "property and casualty" (mainly US) or "general insurance" (mainly UK) actuaries, deal with both physical and legal risks that affect people or their property. Products prominent in their work include auto insurance, homeowners insurance, commercial property insurance, workers' compensation, malpractice insurance, product liability insurance, marine insurance, terrorism insurance, and other types of liability insurance.

Actuaries are also consulted for their expertise in enterprise risk management. This work may involve dynamic financial analysis, stress testing, the formulation of corporate risk policy, and the establishment and operation of corporate risk departments. Actuaries are also involved in other areas of economics and finance, such as analyzing securities offerings or market research.

=== Traditional employment ===
For both life and casualty actuaries, their classic role is calculating premiums and reserves for insurance policies that cover various risks. On the casualty side, analysis often involves quantifying the probability of a loss event (called the frequency) and the size of that loss event (called the severity). The amount of time occurring before the loss event is important, because the insurer will only need to pay after the event has occurred. On the life side, analysis often involves quantifying the worth of a potential sum of money or a financial liability at different times in the future. Since neither of these analysis types is a purely deterministic process, stochastic models are often used to determine frequency and severity distributions, as well as the parameters of these distributions. Forecasting interest yields and currency movements also plays a role in determining future costs, especially for life actuaries.

Actuaries do not always attempt to predict aggregate future events. Often their work relates to determining the cost of financial liabilities that have already occurred, called retrospective reinsurance, or the development or re-pricing of new products.

Actuaries also design and maintain products and systems. They participate in financial reporting of companies' assets and liabilities. Actuaries must communicate complex concepts to clients who may not share their language or depth of knowledge. They work under a code of ethics that covers their communications and work products.

=== Non-traditional employment ===
As an outgrowth of more traditional roles, actuaries also work in the fields of risk management and enterprise risk management for both financial and non-financial corporations. Actuaries in traditional roles study and use tools and data previously in the domain of finance. Two accords—the Basel II accord for financial institutions (2004), and the analogous Solvency II accord for insurance companies (in force since 2016)—require institutions to account for operational risk separately, in addition to credit, reserve, asset, and insolvency risk. Actuarial skills are well suited to this context, because actuaries are trained in analyzing various forms of risk, and judging the potential for gain and loss associated with these forms of risk.

Actuaries also participate in investment advising and asset management, and can be general business managers and chief financial officers or chief investment officers. They analyze business prospects using financial skills in valuing or discounting risky future cash flows; they also apply pricing expertise in insurance to other lines of business. For example, insurance securitization requires both actuarial and finance skills. Actuaries also act as expert witnesses in court trials, by using analysis to estimate the economic value of losses such as lost profits or lost wages.

== History ==
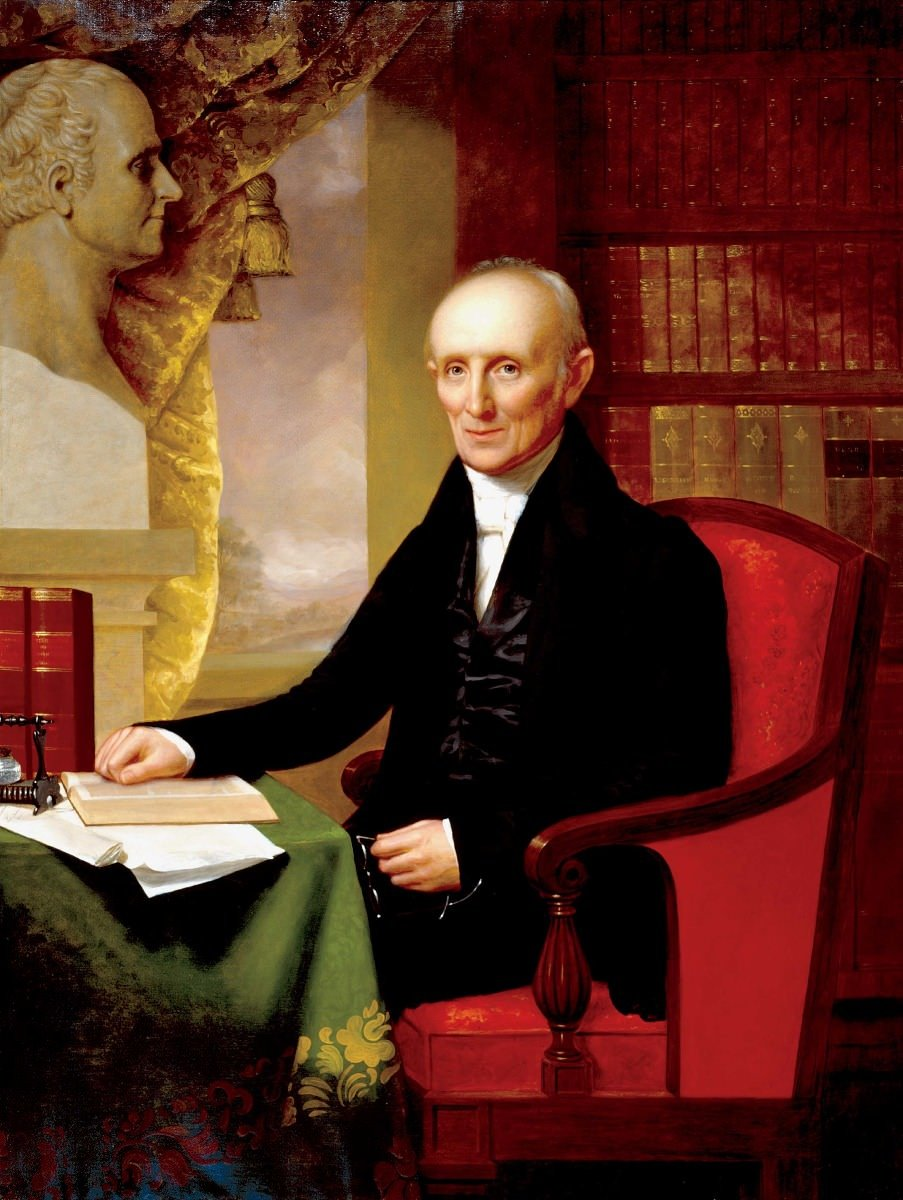
Mathematician Nathaniel Bowditch was one of America's first insurance actuaries.

=== Need for insurance ===
The basic requirements of communal interests gave rise to risk sharing since the dawn of civilization. For example, people who lived their entire lives in a camp had the risk of fire, which would leave their band or family without shelter. After barter came into existence, more complex risks emerged and new forms of risk manifested. Merchants embarking on trade journeys bore the risk of losing goods entrusted to them, their own possessions, or even their lives. Intermediaries developed to warehouse and trade goods, which exposed them to financial risk. The primary providers in extended families or households ran the risk of premature death, disability or infirmity, which could leave their dependents to starve. Credit procurement was difficult if the creditor worried about repayment in the event of the borrower's death or infirmity. Alternatively, people sometimes lived too long from a financial perspective, exhausting their savings, if any, or becoming a burden on others in the extended family or society.

=== Early attempts ===
In the ancient world there was not always room for the sick, suffering, disabled, aged, or the poor—these were often not part of the cultural consciousness of societies. Early methods of protection, aside from the normal support of the extended family, involved charity; religious organizations or neighbors would collect for the destitute and needy. By the middle of the 3rd century, charitable operations in Rome supported 1,500 suffering people. Charitable protection remains an active form of support in the modern era, but receiving charity is uncertain and often accompanied by social stigma.

Elementary mutual aid agreements and pensions did arise in antiquity. Early in the Roman empire, associations were formed to meet the expenses of burial, cremation, and monuments—precursors to burial insurance and friendly societies. A small sum was paid into a communal fund on a weekly basis, and upon the death of a member, the fund would cover the expenses of rites and burial. These societies sometimes sold shares in the building of columbāria, or burial vaults, owned by the fund. Other early examples of mutual surety and assurance pacts can be traced back to various forms of fellowship within the Saxon clans of England and their Germanic forebears, and to Celtic society.

Non-life insurance started as a hedge against loss of cargo during sea travel. Anecdotal reports of such guarantees occur in the writings of Demosthenes, who lived in the 4th century BCE. The earliest records of an official non-life insurance policy come from Sicily, where there is record of a 14th-century contract to insure a shipment of wheat. In 1350, Lenardo Cattaneo assumed "all risks from act of God, or of man, and from perils of the sea" that may occur to a shipment of wheat from Sicily to Tunis up to a maximum of 300 florins. For this he was paid a premium of 18%.

=== Development of theory ===
2003 U.S. mortality (life) table, Table 1, Page 1

During the 17th century, a more scientific basis for risk management was being developed. In 1662, a London draper named John Graunt showed that there were predictable patterns of longevity and death in a defined group, or cohort, of people, despite the uncertainty about the future longevity or mortality of any one individual. This study became the basis for the original life table. Combining this idea with that of compound interest and annuity valuation, it became possible to set up an insurance scheme to provide life insurance or pensions for a group of people, and to calculate with some degree of accuracy each member's necessary contributions to a common fund, assuming a fixed rate of interest. The first person to correctly calculate these values was Edmond Halley. In his work, Halley demonstrated a method of using his life table to calculate the premium someone of a given age should pay to purchase a life-annuity.

=== Early actuaries ===
James Dodson's pioneering work on the level premium system led to the formation of the Society for Equitable Assurances on Lives and Survivorship (now commonly known as Equitable Life) in London in 1762. This was the first life insurance company to use premium rates that were calculated scientifically for long-term life policies, using Dodson's work. After Dodson's death in 1757, Edward Rowe Mores took over the leadership of the group that eventually became the Society for Equitable Assurances. It was he who specified that the chief official should be called an actuary. Previously, the use of the term had been restricted to an official who recorded the decisions, or acts, of ecclesiastical courts, in ancient times originally the secretary of the Roman senate, responsible for compiling the Acta Senatus. Other companies that did not originally use such mathematical and scientific methods most often failed or were forced to adopt the methods pioneered by Equitable.

=== Development of the modern profession ===
In the 18th and 19th centuries, computational complexity was limited to manual calculations. The calculations required to compute fair insurance premiums can be burdensome. The actuaries of that time developed methods to construct easily used tables, using arithmetical short-cuts called commutation functions, to facilitate timely, accurate, manual calculations of premiums. In the mid-19th century, professional bodies were founded to support and further both actuaries and actuarial science, and to protect the public interest by ensuring competency and ethical standards. Since calculations were cumbersome, actuarial shortcuts were commonplace.

Non-life actuaries followed in the footsteps of their life compatriots in the early 20th century. In the United States, the 1920 revision to workers' compensation rates took over two months of around-the-clock work by day and night teams of actuaries. In the 1930s and 1940s, rigorous mathematical foundations for stochastic processes were developed. Actuaries began to forecast losses using models of random events instead of deterministic methods. Computers further revolutionized the actuarial profession. From pencil-and-paper to punchcards to microcomputers, the modeling and forecasting ability of the actuary has grown vastly.

Another modern development is the convergence of modern finance theory with actuarial science. In the early 20th century, some economists and actuaries were developing techniques that can be found in modern financial theory, but for various historical reasons, these developments did not achieve much recognition. (Note: They were relevant to, and achieved recognition from, short-term derivatives traders and the like, but most actuaries ignored them because they were unsuitable for long-term actuarial calculations; they relied heavily on parameter values that were derived from obsolete economic history and were extremely uncertain – in effect, arbitrary – in the context of predicting the longer-term future.) In the late 1980s and early 1990s, there was a distinct effort for actuaries to combine financial theory and stochastic methods into their established models. In the 21st century, the profession, both in practice and in the educational syllabi of many actuarial organizations, combines tables, loss models, stochastic methods, and financial theory, but is still not completely aligned with modern financial economics.

== Remuneration and ranking ==
As there are relatively few actuaries in the world compared to other professions, actuaries are in high demand, and are highly paid for the services they render.

The actuarial profession has been consistently ranked for decades as one of the most desirable. Actuaries typically work standard professional hours in office-based environments and are employed across sectors such as insurance, finance, and consulting. The profession is generally associated with relatively high compensation and stable employment prospects.

It has also been identified in some studies and rankings as a strong profession for women, and as relatively resilient during economic downturns.

== Credentialing and exams ==
Becoming a fully credentialed actuary requires passing a rigorous series of professional examinations, usually taking several years. In some countries, such as Denmark, most study takes place in a university setting. In others, such as the US, most study takes place during employment through a series of examinations. In the UK, and countries based on its process, there is a hybrid university-exam structure.

=== Chartered actuary ===
In the UK, a chartered actuary is a qualified member of the Institute and Faculty of Actuaries (IFoA). This title signifies that the holder has passed rigorous professional exams and adheres to the IFoA's standards of practice and ethics. Members can use the titles Chartered Actuary (Associate) or Chartered Actuary (Fellow). The chartered actuary designation enhances public trust by distinguishing qualified actuaries from those who may not have met the same educational and professional standards.

=== Exam support ===
As these qualifying exams are extremely rigorous, support is usually available to people progressing through the exams. Often, employers provide paid on-the-job study time and paid attendance at seminars designed for the exams. Also, many companies that employ actuaries have automatic pay raises or promotions when exams are passed. As a result, actuarial students have strong incentives for devoting adequate study time during off-work hours. A common rule of thumb for exam students is that, for the Society of Actuaries examinations, roughly 400 hours of study time are necessary for each four-hour exam. Thus, thousands of hours of study time should be anticipated over several years, assuming no failures.

=== Pass marks and pass rates ===
Historically, the actuarial profession has been reluctant to specify the pass marks for its examinations. To address concerns that there are pre-existing pass/fail quotas, a former chairman of the Board of Examiners of the Institute and Faculty of Actuaries stated: "Although students find it hard to believe, the Board of Examiners does not have fail quotas to achieve. Accordingly, pass rates are free to vary (and do). They are determined by the quality of the candidates sitting the examination and in particular how well prepared they are. Fitness to pass is the criterion, not whether you can achieve a mark in the top 40% of candidates sitting." In 2000, the Casualty Actuarial Society (CAS) decided to start releasing pass marks for the exams it offers. The CAS's policy is also not to grade to specific pass ratios; the CAS board affirmed in 2001 that "the CAS shall use no predetermined pass ratio as a guideline for setting the pass mark for any examination. If the CAS determines that 70% of all candidates have demonstrated sufficient grasp of the syllabus material, then those 70% should pass. Similarly, if the CAS determines that only 30% of all candidates have demonstrated sufficient grasp of the syllabus material, then only those 30% should pass."

== Notable actuaries ==
Nathaniel Bowditch (1773–1838)
Early American mathematician remembered for his work on ocean navigation. In 1804, Bowditch became what was probably the United States of America's second insurance actuary as president of the Essex Fire and Marine Insurance Company in Salem, Massachusetts.
Harald Cramér (1893–1985)
Swedish actuary and probabilist notable for his contributions in mathematical statistics, such as the Cramér–Rao inequality. Cramér was an Honorary President of the Swedish Actuarial Society.
Bruno de Finetti (1906–1985)
Italian statistician and actuary renowned for his foundational work in subjective probability theory. He was the founding President of the Italian Central Institute of Statistics in 1926 and set up first the School and then the faculty of statistics, demographic and actuarial sciences in Roma in 1936.
James Dodson (c. 1705 – 1757)
Head of the Royal Mathematical School, and Stone's School, Dodson built on the statistical mortality tables developed by Edmund Halley in 1693.
Edmond Halley (1656–1742)
While Halley actually predated much of what is now considered the start of the actuarial profession, he was the first to rigorously calculate premiums for a life insurance policy mathematically and statistically.
James C. Hickman (1927–2006)
American actuarial educator, researcher, and author.
Oswald Jacoby (1902–1984)
American actuary best known as a contract bridge player, he was the youngest person ever to pass four examinations of the Society of Actuaries.
David X. Li
Canadian qualified actuary who in the first decade of the 21st century pioneered the use of Gaussian copula models for the pricing of collateralized debt obligations (CDOs).
Filip Lundberg (1876–1965)
Swedish actuary and mathematician. Lundberg is considered one of the founders of mathematical risk theory.
Edward Rowe Mores (1731–1778)
First person to use the title 'actuary' with respect to a business position.
William Morgan (1750–1833)
Morgan was the appointed Actuary of the Society for Equitable Assurances in 1775. He expanded on Mores's and Dodson's work, and may be considered the father of the actuarial profession in that his title became applied to the field as a whole.
Robert J. Myers (1912–2010)
American actuary who was instrumental in the creation of the U.S. Social Security program.
Frank Redington (1906–1984)
British actuary who developed the Redington Immunization Theory.
Isaac M. Rubinow (1875–1936)
Founder and first president of the Casualty Actuarial Society.
Elizur Wright (1804–1885)
American actuary and abolitionist, professor of mathematics at Western Reserve College (Ohio). He campaigned for laws that required life insurance companies to hold sufficient reserves to guarantee that policies would be paid.

== Fictional actuaries ==
Actuaries have appeared in works of fiction including literature, theater, television, and film. At times, they have been portrayed as "math-obsessed, socially disconnected individuals with shockingly bad comb-overs", which has resulted in a mixed response amongst actuaries themselves.

== Works cited ==
- Actuarial Standards Board (2022). "About ASB".
- "The Greatest British Actuary ever®". The Actuary. Institute and Faculty of Actuaries. 2003. Archived from the original on October 5, 2015.
- American Insurance Association (2014). Property-Casualty Insurance Basics (Report). Archived from the original (PDF) on March 23, 2015.
- Bader, Lawrence N.; Gold, Jeremy (2003). "Reinventing Pension Actuarial Science" (PDF). Pension Forum. Vol. 14, no. 2. pp. 1–39. Archived (PDF) from the original on October 10, 2022.
- "What Do We Do?". Be an Actuary. 2022.
- "How we manage risk". Be an Actuary. 2022. Archived from the original on May 20, 2024.
- "Exam FAQs". Be an Actuary. 2022.
- Bühlmann, Hans (November 1997). "The actuary: The role and limitations of the profession since the mid-19th century" (PDF). ASTIN Bulletin. 27 (2): 165–171. doi:10.2143/ast.27.2.542046. Archived (PDF) from the original on October 10, 2022.
- "Actuaries". Occupational Outlook Handbook. Bureau of Labor Statistics, U.S. Department of Labor. September 8, 2022.
- "Policy For Setting Pass Marks". Exams & Admissions. Casualty Actuarial Society. March 2, 2001. Archived from the original on August 7, 2013.
- "History". CAS Overview. Casualty Actuarial Society. 2008. Archived from the original on October 30, 2008.
- "Exams". Exams & Admissions. Casualty Actuarial Society. 2022.
- Chaptman, Dennis (September 13, 2006). "James C. Hickman, former business school dean, dies". News. University of Wisconsin–Madison. Archived from the original on January 9, 2008.
- Coleman, Lynn G. (Spring 2003). "Was "About Schmidt" about actuaries?". The Future Actuary. 12 (1). Archived from the original on August 28, 2006.
- Cramér, Harald (1946) [1944]. Mathematical Methods of Statistics. Princeton: Princeton University Press. OCLC 528245 – via Internet Archive. Reprinted: Mathematical Methods of Statistics. Princeton University Press. 1999. ISBN 978-1-4008-8386-8. JSTOR j.ctt1bpm9r4. OCLC 1140707146.
- Cramér, Harald (1969). "Historical review of Filip Lundberg's works on risk theory". Scandinavian Actuarial Journal. (sup3): 6–12. doi:10.1080/03461238.1969.10404602.
- D'Arcy, Stephen P. (May 1989). "On Becoming An Actuary of the Third Kind" (PDF). Proceedings of the Casualty Actuarial Society. LXXVI (145): 45–76. Archived (PDF) from the original on October 10, 2022.
- D'Arcy, Stephen P. (November 2005). "On Becoming An Actuary of the Fourth Kind" (PDF). Proceedings of the Casualty Actuarial Society. XCII (177): 745–754. Archived from the original (PDF) on August 8, 2007.
- Feldblum, Sholom (2001) [1990]. "Introduction". In Lowe, Robert F. (ed.). Foundations of Casualty Actuarial Science (4th ed.). Arlington, Virginia: Casualty Actuarial Society. ISBN 978-0-9624762-2-8. LCCN 2001088378.
- Gillam, William R. (1991). "Retrospective Rating: Excess Loss Factors" (PDF). Proceedings of the Casualty Actuarial Society. LXXVIII: 1–40.
- "U.S. charitable giving estimated to be $307.65 billion in 2008" (PDF). Giving USA. Giving USA Foundation. June 10, 2009. Archived from the original (PDF) on March 4, 2012.
- Government Accountability Office (January 14, 2000). Social Security: Actuarial Projections of the Trust Funds (PDF) (Report). pp. 19–85. AIMD-00-53R.
- "About us". Government Actuary's Department. Gov.uk. 2015.
- Halley, Edmond (1693). "An Estimate of the Degrees of the Mortality of Mankind, Drawn from Curious Tables of the Births and Funerals at the City of Breslaw; With an Attempt to Ascertain the Price of Annuities upon Lives". Philosophical Transactions of the Royal Society of London. 17 (192–206): 596–610. doi:10.1098/rstl.1693.0007. S2CID 186214203.
- Heeney, David; Probert, Terry (March 22, 2002). Actuaries and Product Development: A step beyond Px:n = Ax:n / äx:n (PDF). 27th International Congress of Actuaries. Archived from the original (PDF) on January 6, 2022.
- Hennessy, Kathleen (February 16, 2003). "Actuaries". Wage slaves: careers profiled. The Guardian.
- Heywood, Geoffrey (1985). "Edmond Halley: astronomer and actuary" (PDF). Journal of the Institute of Actuaries. 112 (2): 279–301. doi:10.1017/S002026810004213X. Archived (PDF) from the original on October 8, 2015.
- Hickman, James (2004). "History of Actuarial Profession" (PDF). Encyclopedia of Actuarial Science. John Wiley & Sons, Ltd. p. 4. Archived from the original (PDF) on August 4, 2004.
- "Our qualifications". Student. Institute and Faculty of Actuaries. 2011. Archived from the original on February 12, 2012.
- "Actuaries in Risk Management Actuarial Profession Survey 2010/2011" (PDF). Institute and Faculty of Actuaries. May 2011. Archived from the original (PDF) on March 20, 2012.
- "Practice areas" (PDF). The Official Guide to Becoming an Actuary. Institute and Faculty of Actuaries. September 26, 2014. Archived from the original (PDF) on September 24, 2017.
- Johnston, Harold Whetstone (1909) [1903]. "Burial places and funeral ceremonies". The Private Life of the Romans. Chicago: Scott, Foresman and Company. The Burial Societies §430 (pp. 323–325) – via Internet Archive. "Early in the Empire, associations were formed for the purpose of meeting the funeral expenses of their members, whether the remains were to be buried or cremated, or for the purpose of building columbāria, or for both ... If the members had provided places for the disposal of their bodies after death, they now provided for the necessary funeral expenses by paying into the common fund weekly a small fixed sum, easily within the reach of the poorest of them. When a member died, a stated sum was drawn from the treasury for his funeral ... If the purpose of the society was the building of a columbārium, the cost was first determined and the sum total divided into what we should call shares (sortēs virīlēs), each member taking as many as he could afford and paying their value into the treasury."
- Kendall, David (1983). "A Tribute to Harald Cramer". Journal of the Royal Statistical Society. Series A (General). 146 (3): 211–212. ISSN 0035-9238. JSTOR 2981652.
- Kiviat, Barbara (November 13, 2008). "Where the Recession-Proof Jobs Are". Time. Archived from the original on February 23, 2024.
- Krutov, Alex (2006). "Insurance Linked Securities". Financial Engineering News (48). Archived from the original on June 9, 2007.
- Kurtz, Annalyn (April 25, 2013). "The best job you never thought of". Money. CNN. Archived from the original on April 25, 2013.
- Lijoi, Antonio; Prünster, Igor (2011). "A Conversation with Eugenio Regazzini" (PDF). Statistical Science. 26 (4). Institute of Mathematical Statistics: 647–672. arXiv:1205.4807. doi:10.1214/11-STS362.
- Lewin, Chris (June 14, 2007). "Actuarial History". Institute and Faculty of Actuaries. Archived from the original on October 20, 2011.
- Loan, Albert (Winter 1991–1992). "Institutional Bases of the Spontaneous Order: Surety and Assurance". Humane Studies Review. 7 (1). Archived from the original on June 14, 2006.
- MacGinnitie, James (November 1980). "The Actuary and his Profession: Growth, Development, Promise" (PDF). Proceedings of the Casualty Actuarial Society. LXVII (127): 49–56. Archived from the original (PDF) on March 5, 2016.
- Michelbacher, Gustav F. (1920). "The Technique of Rate Making as Illustrated by the 1920 National Revision of Workmen's Compensations Insurance Rates" (PDF). Proceedings of the Casualty Actuarial Society. VI (14): 201–249. Archived (PDF) from the original on October 10, 2022.
- Muckart, Richard (2010). "Q&A: Making the grade". The Actuary. Archived from the original on May 5, 2015.
- Mungan, Kenneth P. (2002). "The Practicing Investment Actuary" (PDF). The Record. 28 (3). Society of Actuaries: 1–27. Archived from the original (PDF) on March 4, 2016.
- Norberg, Ragnar (1990). Actuarial Statistics – The European Perspective (PDF). International Conference on the Teaching of Statistics 3, Dunedin, New Zealand. Auckland, New Zealand: International Association for Statistical Education. pp. 405–410. Archived from the original (PDF) on March 9, 2012.
- Ogborn, M. E. (December 1956). "The Professional Name of Actuary" (PDF). Journal of the Institute of Actuaries. 82 (2). Faculty and Institute of Actuaries: 233–246. doi:10.1017/S0020268100046424. JSTOR 41139195. Archived (PDF) from the original on March 20, 2012.
- Ogborn, M. E. (July 1973). "Catalogue of an exhibition illustrating the history of actuarial science in the United Kingdom" (PDF). Journal of the Institute of Actuaries. 100. Faculty and Institute of Actuaries: 7–8. Archived (PDF) from the original on March 20, 2012.
- Perkins, Judith (August 25, 1995). The Suffering Self; Pain and Narrative Representation in the Early Christian Era. London, England: Routledge. ISBN 978-0-415-11363-2. LCCN 94042650.
- Prevosto, Virginia R. (December 2000). "CAS Board of Directors Approves New Pass Mark Disclosure Policy" (PDF). Future Fellows. Casualty Actuarial Society. Archived from the original (PDF) on September 23, 2015.
- Riley, Cindy (2013). "Actuaries in action: Why it's rated the number one profession". STEM Education. Archived from the original on February 23, 2014.
- Salmon, Felix (March 2009). "Recipe for Disaster: The Formula That Killed Wall Street". Wired Magazine. Vol. 17, no. 3. Archived from the original on May 16, 2015.
- Seltzer, Frederic; Alin, Steven I. (1969). "The First American Actuary" (PDF). The Actuary. 3 (8). Society of Actuaries. Archived from the original (PDF) on March 4, 2016.
- Shavin, Naomi (June 13, 2014). "The 12 Best Jobs For Women In 2014". Forbes.
- Sieger, Richard (March 1998). "What is an Actuary?". Future Fellows. 4 (1). Archived from the original on September 15, 2015.
- Slud, Eric V. (2006) [2001]. "6: Commutation Functions, Reserves & Select Mortality" (PDF). Actuarial Mathematics and Life-Table Statistics (PDF). pp. 149–150. Archived (PDF) from the original on October 10, 2022. "The Commutation Functions are a computational device to ensure that net single premiums ... can all be obtained from a single table lookup. Historically, this idea has been very important in saving calculational labor when arriving at premium quotes. Even now ... company employees without quantitative training could calculate premiums in a spreadsheet format with the aid of a life table."
- "Admission Requirements to the SOA". Education & Exams. Society of Actuaries. 2018.
- "Oswald Jacoby". Obituary. Transactions of the Society of Actuaries. 36. Society of Actuaries: 616. October 1984. Archived from the original (PDF) on October 9, 2016.
- Stearns, Frank Preston (1905). "Elizur Wright" (text). Cambridge sketches (1st ed.). Philadelphia, Pennsylvania: J. B. Lippincott Company. LCCN 05011051. "This danger could only be averted by placing their rates of insurance on a scientific basis, which should be the same and unalterable for all companies. ... After two or three interviews with Elizur Wright the presidents of the companies came to the conclusion that he was exactly the man that they wanted, and they commissioned him to draw up a revised set of tables and rates which could serve them for a uniform standard."
- Stefan, Michael (2010). "Careers: Breaking the actuarial ceiling". The Actuary. Institute and Faculty of Actuaries. Archived from the original on July 4, 2015.
- Sweeting, Paul (2011). Financial Enterprise Risk Management. International Series on Actuarial Science. Cambridge University Press. ISBN 978-0-521-11164-5. LCCN 2011025050.
- Thomas, David (2012). "Be happy: Become an actuary". Archived from the original on April 20, 2012.
- Thucydides (2009) [c. 431 BCE]. "VI – Funeral Oration of Pericles". The History of the Peloponnesian War. Translated by Richard Crawley. Greece. ISBN 978-0-525-26035-6. "My task is now finished ... those who are here interred have received part of their honours already, and for the rest, their children will be brought up till manhood at the public expense: the state thus offers a valuable prize, as the garland of victory in this race of valour, for the reward both of those who have fallen and their survivors."
- Tolley, H. Dennis; Hickman, James C.; Lew, Edward A. (2012). "Actuarial and Demographic Forecasting Methods". In Manton, Kenneth G.; Singer, Burton; Suzman, Richard M. (eds.). Forecasting the Health of Elderly Populations. Springer Series in Statistics. Springer Science & Business Media. p. 42. ISBN 978-1-4613-9332-0. LCCN 92048819.
- Trowbridge, Charles L. (1989). "Fundamental Concepts of Actuarial Science" (PDF). Revised Edition. Actuarial Education and Research Fund. Archived from the original (PDF) on June 29, 2006.
- "Actuary". U.S. News & World Report Best Jobs 2025. 2025.
- Wagner, Darryl G. (2006). "Is Serving as an Expert Witness in Your Future? You be the Judge". Society of Actuaries. Archived from the original on March 4, 2016.
- Weber, Lauren (2013). "Dust Off Your Math Skills: Actuary Is Best Job of 2013". The Wall Street Journal. Archived from the original on April 23, 2013.
- Whelan, Shane (December 2002). "Actuaries' contributions to financial economics" (PDF). The Actuary. Staple Inn Actuarial Society. pp. 34–35. Archived from the original (PDF) on July 24, 2006.
- Williams Walsh, Mary (February 25, 2010). "Robert J. Myers, Actuary Who Shaped Social Security Program, Dies at 97". The New York Times. Archived from the original on January 6, 2022.
