= Actuarial science =

Statistics applied to risk in insurance and other financial products

2003 US mortality (life) table, table 1, page 1

Actuarial science is the discipline that applies mathematical and statistical methods to assess risk in insurance, pension, finance, investment, psychology, medicine, and other industries and professions.

Actuaries are professionals trained in this discipline. In many countries, actuaries must demonstrate their competence by passing a series of rigorous professional examinations focused in fields such as probability and predictive analysis. According to the U.S. News & World Report, their job often has to do with using mathematics to identify risk so they can mitigate risk.

Actuarial science includes a number of interrelated subjects, including mathematics, probability theory, statistics, finance, economics, financial accounting and computer science. Historically, actuarial science used deterministic models in the construction of tables and premiums. The science has gone through revolutionary changes since the 1980s due to the proliferation of high speed computers and the union of stochastic actuarial models with modern financial theory.

Many universities have undergraduate and graduate degree programs in actuarial science. In 2010, a study published by job search website CareerCast ranked actuary as the #1 job in the United States. The study used five key criteria to rank jobs: environment, income, employment outlook, physical demands, and stress. In 2024, U.S. News & World Report ranked actuary as the third-best job in the business sector and the eighth-best job in STEM.

== Subfields ==
=== Life insurance, pensions and healthcare ===
Actuarial science became a formal mathematical discipline in the late 17th century with the increased demand for long-term insurance coverage such as burial, life insurance, and annuities. These long term coverages required that money be set aside to pay future benefits, such as annuity and death benefits many years into the future. This requires estimating future contingent events, such as the rates of mortality by age, as well as the development of mathematical techniques for discounting the value of funds set aside and invested. This led to the development of an important actuarial concept, referred to as the present value of a future sum. Certain aspects of the actuarial methods for discounting pension funds have come under criticism from modern financial economics.

- In traditional life insurance, actuarial science focuses on the analysis of mortality, the production of life tables, and the application of compound interest to produce life insurance, annuities and endowment policies. Contemporary life insurance programs have been extended to include credit and mortgage insurance, key person insurance for small businesses, long term care insurance and health savings accounts.
- In health insurance, including insurance provided directly by employers, and social insurance, actuarial science focuses on the analysis of rates of disability, morbidity, mortality, fertility and other contingencies. The effects of consumer choice and the geographical distribution of the utilization of medical services and procedures, and the utilization of drugs and therapies, is also of great importance. These factors underlay the development of the Resource-Base Relative Value Scale (RBRVS) at Harvard in a multi-disciplined study. Actuarial science also aids in the design of benefit structures, reimbursement standards, and the effects of proposed government standards on the cost of healthcare.
- In the pension industry, actuarial methods are used to measure the costs of alternative strategies with regard to the design, funding, accounting, administration, and maintenance or redesign of pension plans. The strategies are greatly influenced by short-term and long-term bond rates, the funded status of the pension and benefit arrangements, collective bargaining; the employer's old, new and foreign competitors; the changing demographics of the workforce; changes in the internal revenue code; changes in the attitude of the internal revenue service regarding the calculation of surpluses; and equally importantly, both the short and long term financial and economic trends. It is common with mergers and acquisitions that several pension plans have to be combined or at least administered on an equitable basis. When benefit changes occur, old and new benefit plans have to be blended, satisfying new social demands and various government discrimination test calculations, and providing employees and retirees with understandable choices and transition paths. Benefit plans liabilities have to be properly valued, reflecting both earned benefits for past service, and the benefits for future service. Finally, funding schemes have to be developed that are manageable and satisfy the standards board or regulators of the appropriate country, such as the Financial Accounting Standards Board in the United States.
- In social welfare programs, the Office of the Chief Actuary (OCACT), Social Security Administration plans and directs a program of actuarial estimates and analyses relating to SSA-administered retirement, survivors and disability insurance programs and to proposed changes in those programs. It evaluates operations of the Federal Old-Age and Survivors Insurance Trust Fund and the Federal Disability Insurance Trust Fund, conducts studies of program financing, performs actuarial and demographic research on social insurance and related program issues involving mortality, morbidity, utilization, retirement, disability, survivorship, marriage, unemployment, poverty, old age, families with children, etc., and projects future workloads. In addition, the Office is charged with conducting cost analyses relating to the Supplemental Security Income (SSI) program, a general-revenue financed, means-tested program for low-income aged, blind and disabled people. The office provides technical and consultative services to the Commissioner, to the board of trustees of the Social Security Trust Funds, and its staff appears before Congressional Committees to provide expert testimony on the actuarial aspects of Social Security issues.

=== Applications to other forms of insurance ===
Actuarial science is also applied to property, casualty, liability, and general insurance. In these forms of insurance, coverage is generally provided on a renewable period (such as a yearly). Coverage can be cancelled at the end of the period by either party.

Property and casualty insurance companies tend to specialize because of the complexity and diversity of risks. One division is to organize around personal and commercial lines of insurance. Personal lines of insurance are for individuals and include fire, auto, homeowners, theft, and umbrella coverages. Commercial lines address the insurance needs of businesses and include property, business continuation, product liability, fleet/commercial vehicle, workers compensation, fidelity and surety, and D&O insurance. The insurance industry also provides coverage for exposures such as catastrophe, weather-related risks, earthquakes, patent infringement and other forms of corporate espionage, terrorism, and "one-of-a-kind" (e.g., satellite launch). Actuarial science provides data collection, measurement, estimating, forecasting, and valuation tools to provide financial and underwriting data for management to assess marketing opportunities and the nature of the risks. Actuarial science often helps to assess the overall risk from catastrophic events in relation to its underwriting capacity or surplus.

In the reinsurance fields, actuarial science can be used to design and price reinsurance and retrocession arrangements, and to establish reserve funds for known claims and future claims and catastrophes.

=== Actuaries in criminal justice ===
There is an increasing trend to recognize that actuarial skills can be applied to a range of applications outside the traditional fields of insurance, pensions, etc. One notable example is the use in some US states of actuarial models to set criminal sentencing guidelines. These models attempt to predict the chance of re-offending according to rating factors which include the type of crime, age, educational background and ethnicity of the offender. However, these models have been open to criticism as providing justification for discrimination against specific ethnic groups by law enforcement personnel. Whether this is statistically correct or a self-fulfilling correlation remains under debate.

Another example is the use of actuarial models to assess the risk of sex offense recidivism. Actuarial models and associated tables, such as the MnSOST-R, Static-99, and SORAG, have been used since the late 1990s to determine the likelihood that a sex offender will re-offend and thus whether he or she should be institutionalized or set free.

=== Actuarial science related to modern financial economics ===
Traditional actuarial science and modern financial economics in the US have different practices, which is caused by different ways of calculating funding and investment strategies, and by different regulations.

Regulations are from the Armstrong investigation of 1905, the Glass–Steagall Act of 1932, the adoption of the Mandatory Security Valuation Reserve by the National Association of Insurance Commissioners, which cushioned market fluctuations, and the Financial Accounting Standards Board, (FASB) in the US and Canada, which regulates pensions valuations and funding.

== History ==
Historically, much of the foundation of actuarial theory predated modern financial theory. In the early twentieth century, actuaries were developing many techniques that can be found in modern financial theory, but for various historical reasons, these developments did not achieve much recognition.

As a result, actuarial science developed along a different path, becoming more reliant on assumptions, as opposed to the arbitrage-free risk-neutral valuation concepts used in modern finance. The divergence is not related to the use of historical data and statistical projections of liability cash flows, but is instead caused by the manner in which traditional actuarial methods apply market data with those numbers. For example, one traditional actuarial method suggests that changing the mix of investments can change the value of liabilities and assets (by changing the discount rate assumption). This concept is inconsistent with financial economics.

The potential of modern financial economics theory to complement existing actuarial science was recognized by actuaries in the mid-twentieth century. In the late 1980s and early 1990s, there was a distinct effort for actuaries to combine financial theory and stochastic methods into their established models. Ideas from financial economics became increasingly influential in actuarial thinking, and actuarial science has started to embrace more sophisticated mathematical modelling of finance. Today, the profession, both in practice and in the educational syllabi of many actuarial organizations, is cognizant of the need to reflect the combined approach of tables, loss models, stochastic methods, and financial theory. However, assumption-dependent concepts are still widely used (such as the setting of the discount rate assumption as mentioned earlier), particularly in North America.

Product design adds another dimension to the debate. Financial economists argue that pension benefits are bond-like and should not be funded with equity investments without reflecting the risks of not achieving expected returns. But some pension products do reflect the risks of unexpected returns. In some cases, the pension beneficiary assumes the risk, or the employer assumes the risk. The current debate now seems to be focusing on four principles:

1. financial models should be free of arbitrage.
2. assets and liabilities with identical cash flows should have the same price. This is at odds with FASB.
3. the value of an asset is independent of its financing.
4. how pension assets should be invested

Essentially, financial economics state that pension assets should not be invested in equities for a variety of theoretical and practical reasons.

=== Pre-formalisation ===
Elementary mutual aid agreements and pensions arose in antiquity. Early in the Roman Empire, associations were formed to meet the expenses of burial, cremation, and monuments—precursors to burial insurance and friendly societies. A small sum was paid into a communal fund on a weekly basis, and upon the death of a member, the fund would cover the expenses of rites and burial. These societies sometimes sold shares in the building of columbāria, or burial vaults, owned by the fund—the precursor to mutual insurance companies. Other early examples of mutual surety and assurance pacts can be traced back to various forms of fellowship within the Saxon clans of England and their Germanic forebears, and to Celtic society. However, many of these earlier forms of surety and aid would often fail due to lack of understanding and knowledge.

=== Initial development ===
The 17th century was a period of advances in mathematics in Germany, France and England. At the same time there was a rapidly growing desire and need to place the valuation of personal risk on a more scientific basis. Independently of each other, compound interest was studied and probability theory emerged as a well-understood mathematical discipline. Another important advance came in 1662 from a London draper, the father of demography, John Graunt, who showed that there were predictable patterns of longevity and death in a group, or cohort, of people of the same age, despite the uncertainty of the date of death of any one individual. This study became the basis for the original life table. One could now set up an insurance scheme to provide life insurance or pensions for a group of people, and to calculate with some degree of accuracy how much each person in the group should contribute to a common fund assumed to earn a fixed rate of interest. The first person to demonstrate publicly how this could be done was Edmond Halley (of Halley's Comet fame). Halley constructed his own life table, and showed how it could be used to calculate the premium amount someone of a given age should pay to purchase a life annuity.

=== Early actuaries ===
James Dodson's pioneering work on the long term insurance contracts under which the same premium is charged each year led to the formation of the Society for Equitable Assurances on Lives and Survivorship (now commonly known as Equitable Life) in London in 1762. William Morgan is often considered the father of modern actuarial science for his work in the field in the 1780s and 90s. Many other life insurance companies and pension funds were created over the following 200 years. Equitable Life was the first to use the word "actuary" for its chief executive officer in 1762. Previously, "actuary" meant an official who recorded the decisions, or "acts", of ecclesiastical courts. Other companies that did not use such mathematical and scientific methods most often failed or were forced to adopt the methods pioneered by Equitable.

=== Technological advances ===
In the 18th and 19th centuries, calculations were performed without computers. The computations of life insurance premiums and reserving requirements are rather complex, and actuaries developed techniques to make the calculations as easy as possible, for example "commutation functions" (essentially precalculated columns of summations over time of discounted values of survival and death probabilities). Actuarial organizations were founded to support and further both actuaries and actuarial science, and to protect the public interest by promoting competency and ethical standards. However, calculations remained cumbersome, and actuarial shortcuts were commonplace. Non-life actuaries followed in the footsteps of their life insurance colleagues during the 20th century. The 1920 revision for the New-York based National Council on Workmen's Compensation Insurance rates took over two months of around-the-clock work by day and night teams of actuaries. In the 1930s and 1940s, the mathematical foundations for stochastic processes were developed. Actuaries could now begin to estimate losses using models of random events, instead of the deterministic methods they had used in the past. The introduction and development of the computer further revolutionized the actuarial profession. From pencil-and-paper to punchcards to current high-speed devices, the modeling and forecasting ability of the actuary has rapidly improved while still being heavily dependent on the assumptions input into the models; actuaries have needed to adjust to this new world.

== See also ==
- Actuarial control cycle
- Actuarial exam
- Actuarial notation
- Actuarial present value
- Black swan theory
- Category:Actuarial associations
- Data mining
- Financial risk management § Insurance
- Outline of actuarial science
- Reinsurance Actuarial Premium
- Ruin theory
- Scenario optimization
