= De Moivre's law =

Survival model in actuarial science

De Moivre's Law is a survival model applied in actuarial science, named for Abraham de Moivre. It is a simple law of mortality based on a linear survival function.

== Definition ==
De Moivre's law has a single parameter $\omega$ called the ultimate age. Under de Moivre's law, a newborn has probability of surviving at least x years given by the survival function

$$S(x) = 1 - \frac{x}{\omega}, \qquad 0 \leq x < \omega.$$

In actuarial notation (x) denotes a status or life that has survived to age x, and T(x) is the future lifetime of (x) (T(x) is a random variable). The conditional probability that (x) survives to age x+t is Pr[T(0) ≥ x+t | T(0) ≥ x] = S(x+t) / S(x), which is denoted by ${}_t p_x$. Under de Moivre's law, the conditional probability that a life aged x years survives at least t more years is

$${}_t p_x = \frac{S(x+t)}{S(x)} = \frac{\omega-(x+t)}{\omega-x},
\qquad 0 \leq t < \omega-x,$$

and the future lifetime random variable T(x) therefore follows a uniform distribution on $(0, \, \omega-x)$.

The actuarial notation for conditional probability of failure is ${}_t q_x$ = Pr[0 ≤ T(x) ≤ t|T(0) ≥ x]. Under de Moivre's law, the probability that (x) fails to survive to age x+t is

$${}_t q_x = \frac{S(x)-S(x+t)}{S(x)} = \frac{t}{\omega-x}.$$

The force of mortality (hazard rate or failure rate) is $\mu(x)=-S'(x)/S(x)=f(x)/S(x),$ where f(x) is the probability density function. Under de Moivre's law, the force of mortality for a life aged x is

$$\mu(x+t) = \frac{1}{\omega - (x+t)}, \qquad 0 \leq t < \omega-x,$$

which has the property of an increasing failure rate with respect to age.

De Moivre's law is applied as a simple analytical law of mortality and the linear assumption is also applied as a model for interpolation for discrete survival models such as life tables.

== History ==
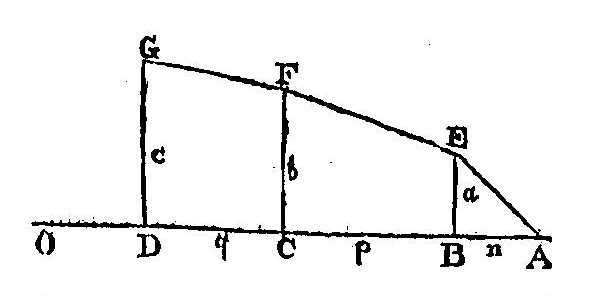
de Moivre's illustration of his piecewise linear approximation

De Moivre's law first appeared in his 1725 Annuities upon Lives, the earliest known example of an actuarial textbook. Despite the name now given to it, de Moivre himself did not consider his law (he called it a "hypothesis") to be a true description of the pattern of human mortality. Instead, he introduced it as a useful approximation when calculating the cost of annuities. In his text, de Moivre noted that " ... although the Notion of an equable Decrement of Life ... [does] not exactly agree with the Tables, yet that Notion may successfully be employed in constructing a Table of the Values of Annuities for Ages not inferiour to Twelve ... ". Furthermore, although his text contained an algebraic demonstration that applied to the entire expected future life span, de Moivre also supplied an algebraic demonstration that applied only to a limited number of years. It was this latter result that was used in his subsequent numerical examples. These examples showed de Moivre using his hypothesis in a piecewise fashion, wherein he assumed that the overall pattern of human mortality could be approximated by several straight-line segments (see his illustration to the right). He wrote that "since the Decrements of Life may without any sensible Error be supposed equal, for any short Interval of Time, it follows that if the whole Extent of Life be divided into several shorter Intervals, ... , the Values of Annuities for Life ... may easily be calculated ... conformably to any Table of Observations, and for any Rate of Interest". For both of the quotes, de Moivre's references to "tables" were to actuarial life tables.

Modern authors are not consistent in their treatment of de Moivre's role in the history of mortality laws. On the one hand, Dick London describes de Moivre's law as "the first continuous probability distribution to be suggested" for use as a model of human survival. Robert Batten takes a similar view, adding that "[de Moivre's] hypothesis .. has of course been found unrealistic". In contrast, the surveys of analytical human survival models by Spiegelman and Benjamin do not mention de Moivre at all (in both cases, the surveys start with the work of Benjamin Gompertz). In his essay on the history of actuarial science, Stephen Haberman does mention de Moivre, but in the section on "Life Insurance Mathematics" and not the one on "Life Tables and Survival Models". A middle ground of sorts was taken by C. W. Jordan in his Life Contingencies, where he included de Moivre in his section on "Some famous laws of mortality", but added that "de Moivre recognized that this was a very rough approximation [whose objective was] the practical one of simplifying the calculation of life annuity values, which in those days was an arduous task".

Another indication that de Moivre himself did not consider his "hypothesis" to be a true reflection of human mortality is the fact that he offered two distinct hypotheses in the Annuities upon Lives. When he turned his attention to the question of valuing annuities payable on more than one life, de Moivre found it convenient to drop his assumption of an equal number of deaths (per year) in favor of an assumption of equal probabilities of death at each year of age (i.e., what is now called the "constant force of mortality" assumption). Although the constant-force assumption is also recognized today as a simple analytical law of mortality, it has never been known as "de Moivre's second law" or any other such name.
