= Actuarial reserves =

Reserve set aside for future insurance liabilities

In insurance, an actuarial reserve is a reserve set aside for future insurance liabilities. It is generally equal to the actuarial present value of the future cash flows of a contingent event. In the insurance context an actuarial reserve is the present value of the future cash flows of an insurance policy and the total liability of the insurer is the sum of the actuarial reserves for every individual policy. Regulated insurers are required to keep offsetting assets to pay off this future liability.

== The loss random variable ==
The loss random variable is the starting point in the determination of any type of actuarial reserve calculation. Define $K(x)$ to be the future state lifetime random variable of a person aged x. Then, for a death benefit of one dollar and premium $P$, the loss random variable, $L$, can be written in actuarial notation as a function of $K(x)$

$$L = v^{K(x)+1} - P\ddot{a}_{\overline{K(x)+1}|}$$

From this we can see that the present value of the loss to the insurance company now if the person dies in t years, is equal to the present value of the death benefit minus the present value of the premiums.

The loss random variable described above only defines the loss at issue. For K(x) > t, the loss random variable at time t can be defined as:

$${}_t L = v^{K(x)+1-t} - P\ddot{a}_{\overline{K(x)+1-t|}}$$

== Net level premium reserves ==
Net level premium reserves, also called benefit reserves, only involve two cash flows and are used for some US GAAP reporting purposes. The valuation premium in an NLP reserve is a premium such that the value of the reserve at time zero is equal to zero. The net level premium reserve is found by taking the expected value of the loss random variable defined above. They can be formulated prospectively or retrospectively. The amount of prospective reserves at a point in time is derived by subtracting the actuarial present value of future valuation premiums from the actuarial present value of the future insurance benefits. Retrospective reserving subtracts accumulated value of benefits from accumulated value of valuation premiums as of a point in time. The two methods yield identical results (assuming bases are the same for both prospective and retrospective calculations).

As an example, consider a whole life insurance policy of one dollar issued on (x) with yearly premiums paid at the start of the year and death benefit paid at the end of the year. In actuarial notation, a benefit reserve is denoted as V. Our objective is to find the value of the net level premium reserve at time t. First we define the loss random variable at time zero for this policy. Hence

$$L = v^{K(x)+1} - P\ddot{a}_{\overline{K(x)+1|}}$$

Then, taking expected values we have:

$$\operatorname{E}[L] = \operatorname{E}[v^{K(x)+1} - P\ddot{a}_{\overline{K(x)+1|}}]$$

$$\operatorname{E}[L] = \operatorname{E}[v^{K(x)+1}] - P\operatorname{E}[\ddot{a}_{\overline{K(x)+1|}}]$$

$${}_0\!V_x=A_x - P\cdot\ddot{a}_x$$

Setting the reserve equal to zero and solving for P yields:

$$P=\frac{A_x}{\ddot{a}_x}$$

For a whole life policy as defined above the premium is denoted as $P_x$ in actuarial notation. The NLP reserve at time t is the expected value of the loss random variable at time t given K(x) > t

$${}_t L = v^{K(x)+1-t} - P_x \ddot{a}_{\overline{K(x)+1-t|}}$$
$$\operatorname{E}[{}_t L\mid K(x)>t] = \operatorname{E}[v^{K(x)+1-t}\mid K(x)>t] - P_x \operatorname{E}[\ddot{a}_{\overline{K(x)+1-t|}}\mid K(x)>t]$$

$${}_t\!V_x=A_{x+t}-P_x\cdot\ddot{a}_{x+t}$$

where ${ }P_x=\frac{A_x}{\ddot{a}_{x}}$

== Modified reserves ==
Modified reserves are based on premiums which are not level by duration. Almost all modified reserves are intended to accumulate lower reserves in early policy years than they would under the net level premium method. This is to allow the issuer greater margins to pay for expenses which are usually very high in these years. To do this, modified reserves assume a lower premium in the first year or two than the net level premium, and later premiums are higher. The Commissioner's Reserve Valuation Method, used for statutory reserves in the United States, allows for use of modified reserves.

=== Full preliminary term method ===
A full preliminary term reserve is calculated by treating the first year of insurance as a one-year term insurance. Reserves for the remainder of the insurance are calculated as if they are for the same insurance minus the first year. This method usually decreases reserves in the first year sufficiently to allow payment of first year expenses for low-premium plans, but not high-premium plans such as limited-pay whole life.

== Computation of actuarial reserves ==
The calculation process often involves a number of assumptions, particularly in relation to future claims experience, and investment earnings potential. Generally, the computation involves calculating the expected claims for each future time period. These expected future cash outflows are then discounted to reflect interest to the date of the expected cash flow.

For example, if we expect to pay $300,000 in Year 1, $200,000 in year 2 and $150,000 in Year 3, and we are able to invest reserves to earn 8%p.a., the respective contributions to Actuarial Reserves are:

- Year 1: $300,000 × (1.08)^{−1} = $277,777.78
- Year 2: $200,000 × (1.08)^{−2} = $171,467.76
- Year 3: $150,000 × (1.08)^{−3} = $119,074.84.

If we sum the discounted expected claims over all years in which a claim could be experienced, we have completed the computation of Actuarial Reserves. In the above example, if there were no expected future claims after year 3, our computation would give Actuarial Reserves of $568,320.38.

== See also ==
- Actuarial science
- Actuary
- Financial risk management § Insurance
- Force of mortality
- Life insurance
- Life table
- Statutory reserve
