= Statutory reserve =

In the business of insurance, statutory reserves are those assets an insurance company is legally required to maintain on its balance sheet with respect to the unmatured obligations (i.e., expected future claims) of the company. Statutory reserves are a type of actuarial reserve.

== Purpose ==
Statutory reserves are intended to ensure that insurance companies are able to meet future obligations created by insurance policies. These reserves must be reported in statements filed with insurance regulatory bodies. They are calculated with a certain level of conservatism in order to protect policyholders and beneficiaries.

== Methods ==
There are two types of methods for calculation of statutory reserves. Reserve methodology may be fully prescribed by law, which is often called formula-based reserving. This is in contrast to principles-based reserves, where actuaries are given latitude to use professional judgement in determining methodology and assumptions for reserve calculation. In the United States, where formula-based reserves are used, the National Association of Insurance Commissioners plans to implement principles-based reserves in 2017.

== Life insurance in the United States ==
In the U.S. life insurance industry, statutory reserves are most commonly computed using the Commissioner's Reserve Valuation Method, or CRVM, the method prescribed by law for computing minimum required reserves.

The size of a CRVM reserve, as with most life reserves, is affected by the age and sex of the insured person, how long the policy for which it is computed has been in force, the plan of insurance offered by the policy, the rate of interest used in the calculation, and the mortality table with which the actuarial present values are computed.

The Commissioner's Reserve Valuation Method was itself established by the Standard Valuation Law (SVL), which was created by the NAIC and adopted by the several states shortly after World War II. The first mortality table prescribed by the SVL was the 1941 CSO (Commissioner's Standard Ordinary) table, at a maximum interest rate of 3½%. Subsequent amendments to the Standard Valuation Law have permitted the use of more modern mortality tables and higher rates of interest. The effect of these changes has in general been to reduce the amount of the reserves which life insurance companies are legally required to hold.

== See also ==
- Actuarial reserves
- Elizur Wright
- Statutory accounting principles
