= Hattendorff's theorem =

Hattendorff's Theorem, attributed to K. Hattendorff (1868), is a theorem in actuarial science that describes the allocation of the variance or risk of the loss random variable over the lifetime of an actuarial reserve. In other words, Hattendorff's theorem demonstrates that the variation in the present value of the loss of an issued insurance policy can be allocated to the future years during which the insured is still alive. This, in turn, facilitates the management of risk prevalent in such insurance contracts over short periods of time.

== Hattendorff's Theorem ==
The main result of the theorem has three equivalent formulations:

Hattendorff's Theorem

$$\begin{align}
&\mathrm{Var}[L_h | K(x) \geq h] \\
&=\sum_{k = h}^{\infty} v^{2(k - h)} \mathrm{Var}[\Lambda_k|K(x) \geq h] \\
&=\mathrm{Var}[\Lambda_h|K(x)\geq h] + v^2 \mathrm{Var}[L_{h+1}|K(x) \geq h] \\
&= \sum_{k = h}^{h + j - 1} v^{2(k - h)} \mathrm{Var}[\Lambda_k|K(x) \geq h] + v^{2 j}\mathrm{Var}[L_{h+j}|K(x)\geq h]
\end{align}$$

where:

Variable	Explanation
$K(x)$	The number of whole years that a life status x survives. If $T_x$ is the distribution of the lifetime of an insured, then $K(x)=\lfloor T_x \rfloor$.
$_{k}p_{j}$	Actuarial notation for $\mathrm{Pr}(j \leq T_x < j + k)$.
$\pi_j$	The premium received by the insured in year j.
$b_j$	The benefit paid to the insured in year j.
$L_h$	The actuarial present value of the total loss over the remaining life of the policy at time h.
$C_h$	The present value of the net cash loss from the policy in the year (h, h+1).
$v$	The discount factor for one year.
$\Lambda_h$	The present value of the net cash loss from the policy plus the change in total liabilities in the year (h, h+1).
$V_h$	The benefit reserve at time h, equal to $\mathbb{E}[L_h | K(x) \geq h]$.

In its above formulation, and in particular the first result, Hattendorff's theorem states that the variance of $L_h$, the insurer's total loss over the remaining life of the policy at time h, can be calculated by discounting the variances of the yearly net losses (cash losses plus changes in net liabilities) $\Lambda_k$ in future years.

== Background ==
In the most general stochastic setting in which the analysis of reserves is carried out, consider an insurance policy written at time zero, over which the insured pays yearly premiums $\pi_0, \pi_1\dots \pi_{K(x)}$ at the beginning of each year starting today until the year of death of the insured. Furthermore, the insured receives a benefit of $K(x)+1$, at the end of the year of death, equal to $b_{K(x)+1}$. No other payments are received nor paid over the lifetime of the policy.

Suppose an insurance company is interested to know the cash loss from this policy over the year (h, h+1). Of course, if the death of the insured happens prior to time h, or when $K(x) < h$, then there is no remaining loss and $C_h = 0$. If the death of the insured occurs exactly at time h, or when $K(x) = h$, then the loss on the policy is equal to the present value of the benefit paid in the following year, $v b_{h+1}$, less the premium paid at time h. Hence in this case $C_h = v b_{h + 1} - \pi_h.$ Lastly, if the death of the insured occurs after time h, or when $K(x) > h$, then the cash loss in the year (h, h+1) is just the negative of the premium received at time h (cash inflows are treated as negative losses). Hence we summarize this result as

$$C_h =
\begin{cases}
0 &\mbox{if } K(x) = 0,1 \dots h-1 \\
v b_{h + 1} - \pi_h &\mbox{if } K(x) = h \\
-\pi_h &\mbox{if } K(x) = h+1, h+2 \dots \\
\end{cases}$$

Furthermore, the actuarial present value of the future cash losses in each year has the explicit formula

$$L_h =
\begin{cases}
0 &\mbox{if } K(x) = 0,1 \dots h-1 \\
v b_{K(x) + 1} - \pi_{K(x)} &\mbox{if } K(x) = h \\
v^{K(x) - h + 1} b_{K(x) + 1} - \sum_{k=h}^{K(x)} v^{k-h} \pi_k &\mbox{if } K(x) = h+1, h+2 \dots
\end{cases}$$

Derivation of the formula for $L_h$.
The present value of the loss on the policy at time h is the present value of all future cash losses

$$L_h = \sum_{k = h}^{\infty} v^{k - h} C_h.$$

Expanding this result, it is easy to see using the definition of $C_h$ that, when $K(x)>h$,

$$\begin{align}
L_h &= \sum_{k = h}^{K(x)-1} v^{k - h} C_h + v^{K(x)-h} C_{K(x)} + \sum_{k = K(x)+1}^{\infty} v^{k-h}C_h \\
&= -\sum_{k=h}^{K(x) - 1} v^{k-h} \pi_k + v^{K(x)-h} \left( v b_{K(x)+1} - \pi_h \right) \\
&= v^{K(x) - h + 1} b_{K(x) + 1} - \sum_{k=h}^{K(x)} v^{k-h} \pi_k.
\end{align}$$

Similarly, when $K(x) = h$, then $L_h = C_{K(x)}$. Finally, when $K(x) < h$, the summation, and hence the loss on the policy, is zero.

In the analysis of reserves, a central quantity of interest is the benefit reserve $V_h$ at time h, which is the expected loss on the policy at time h given that status x has survived to age h

$$V_h = \mathbb{E}[L_h|K(x)\geq h]$$

which admits to the closed form expression

$$V_h = \sum_{k = 0}^{\infty} \left( v^{k + 1} b_{k + h + 1} - \sum_{j=0}^{k} v^{j} \pi_{j+h}\right) {_{k}p_{x+h}} q_{x + h + k}$$.

Derivation of the formula for $V_h$.
Here we derive the above formula for the benefit reserve.

$$\begin{align}
V_h &= \mathbb{E}[L_h|K(x)\geq h] \\
&= \mathbb{E}\left[v^{K(x) - h + 1} b_{K(x) + 1} - \sum_{k=h}^{K(x)} v^{k-h} \pi_k | K(x) \geq h\right].
\end{align}$$

In order to proceed, we make the assumption that the remaining lifetime of a life status x that has lived to time h, $K(x) - h$, follows the same (kurtate) probability distribution as another randomly chosen individual from the group of insureds but of age $x + h$, with distribution $K(x+h)$. This means that, in terms of expected values, $\mathbb{E}[f(K(x) - h)|K(x) \geq h] = \mathbb{E}[f(K(x+h))]$ for any function over which the expectation is defined. Then, using a clever algebraic trick, we can rewrite the benefit reserve as

$$\begin{align}
V_h &= \mathbb{E}\left[v^{(K(x) - h) + 1} b_{(K(x) - h) + h + 1} - \sum_{j=0}^{K(x) - h} v^{j} \pi_{j+h} | K(x) \geq h\right] \\
&= \mathbb{E}\left[v^{K(x+h) + 1} b_{K(x+h) + h + 1} - \sum_{j=0}^{K(x+h)} v^{j} \pi_{j+h}\right] \\
&= \sum_{k = 0}^{\infty} \left( v^{k + 1} b_{k + h + 1} - \sum_{j=0}^{k} v^{j} \pi_{j+h}\right) \mathrm{Pr}(K(x+h) = k) \\
&= {\sum_{k = 0}^{\infty} \left(v^{k + 1} b_{k + h + 1} - \sum_{j=0}^{k} v^{j} \pi_{j+h}\right)} {_{k}p_{x+h}} q_{x + h + k}
\end{align}$$

Lastly, the present value of the net cash loss at time h over the year (h, h+1), denoted $\Lambda_h$, is equal to the present value of the cash loss in year h, $C_h$ (see above), plus the present value of the change in liabilities $PV(\Delta V_h)$ at time h. In other words, $\Lambda_h = C_h + v\Delta Liabilities$. If $K(x) > h$, then $\Lambda_h = -\pi_h + (v V_{h+1} - V_h)$. Similarly, if $K(x) = h$, then $\Lambda_h = (v b_{h+1} - \pi_h) - V_h$ since there is no reserve after the year of death. Finally, if $K(x) < h$, then there is no loss in the future and $\Lambda_h = 0$. Summarizing, this yields the following result, which is important in the formulation of Hattendorff's theorem

$$\Lambda_h =
\begin{cases}
0 &\mbox{if } K(x) = 0,1 \dots h - 1 \\
(v b_{h+1} - \pi_h) - V_h &\mbox{if } K(x) = h \\
(v V_{h+1} - V_h) - \pi_h &\mbox{if } K(x) = h + 1, h + 2 \dots
\end{cases}.$$

== Proofs ==
The proof of the first equality is written as follows. First, by writing the present value of future net losses at time h,

$$\begin{align}
\sum_{k = h}^{\infty} v^{k - h} \Lambda_k &= \sum_{k = h}^{\infty} v^{k - h} [C_k + v\Delta \text{Liabilities in year }(k, k+1)] \\
&= \sum_{k = h}^{\infty} v^{k - h} C_k + \sum_{k = h}^{\infty} v^{k - h + 1} \Delta \text{Liabilities in year }(k, k+1)\\
&= L_h + \sum_{k = h}^{\infty} v^{k - h + 1} (vV_{k+1}- V_k) \\
&= L_h + \sum_{k = h}^{\infty} v^{(k + 1) - h + 1} V_{k+1} - \sum_{k = h}^{\infty} v^{k - h + 1} V_k \\
\end{align}$$

from which it is easy to see that

$$L_h = \sum_{k = h}^{\infty} v^{k - h} \Lambda_k + V_h.$$

It is known that the individual net cash flows in different years are uncorrelated, or $\mathrm{Cov}(\Lambda_h\Lambda_j | K(x) \geq k) = 0$ when $k \leq h < j$ (see Bowers et al., 1997, for a proof of this result). Using these two results, we conclude that

$\mathrm{Var}[L_h|K(x)\geq h] = \mathrm{Var}\left[\sum_{k = h}^{\infty} v^{k - h} \Lambda_k + V_h |K(x) \geq h \right] = \sum_{k = h}^{\infty} v^{2(k - h)} \mathrm{Var}[\Lambda_k|K(x)\geq h]$

which proves the first part of the theorem. The reader is referred to (Bowers et al., pg 241) for the proof of the other equalities.
