= Hattendorf =

Hattendorf a German surname that is classified as being of habitation origin. Habitation names are those family names which are derived from either the location or the town or place of residence of the initial bearer or from the name of the town or village from whence he hailed. Hattendorf can be traced back to 1547. The origin of the family name Hattendorf is Germany. Notable people with the surname include:

- John B. Hattendorf (born 1941), American naval historian

== See also ==
=== Academia ===
- Hattendorf Prize, an academic award for research in maritime history named for John B. Hattendorf
- Hattendorff's theorem, a theorem in actuarial science

=== Places ===
- Hattendorf, a place in Auetal, Schaumburg, Germany
- Hattendorf, a village in Alsfeld, Vogelbergkreis, Germany
