= Mortality forecasting =

Method of predicting future mortality rates

Mortality forecasting refers to the art and science of determining likely future mortality rates. It is especially important in rich countries with a high proportion of aged people, since populations with lower mortality accumulate more pensions.

== See also ==
- Lee-Carter model
- Life expectancy
- Actuarial science
