= Statutory accounting principles =

Accounting rules for US insurance companies

The statutory accounting principles are a set of accounting rules for insurance companies set forth by the National Association of Insurance Commissioners in the United States. They are used to prepare the statutory financial statements of insurance companies. Statutory Accounting Principles are designed to assist state insurance departments in the regulation of the solvency of insurance companies. Although there are minor state-by-state variations, they are the basis for state regulation throughout the United States.

The rules are issued as discussion drafts, and public comments are solicited, before they are codified in the NAIC Accounting Practices and Procedures Manual.

== See also ==
- Generally Accepted Accounting Principles (United States)
- Statutory reserve
