= Ana Diez-Roux =

Ana Victoria Diez-Roux
- Born: Argentina
- Education: The Johns Hopkins University, School of Hygiene and Public Health, USA
- Known for: social epidemiology, environmental & neighborhood effect on health, multilevel modeling

Ana Victoria Diez-Roux is the former dean of the Dornsife School of Public Health and Distinguished University Professor of epidemiology at Drexel University. Her research focuses on the social determinants of health, and the impacts of neighborhoods on health.

== Education ==
Diez-Roux earned an MD degree from the University of Buenos Aires in 1985. She worked as a pediatrician in Argentina prior to coming to the United States to study at Johns Hopkins University School of Hygiene and Public Health, where she earned a Masters in Public Health in 1991 and a PhD in 1995.

== Career ==
Prior to beginning her term as dean at the Dornsife School of Public Health in 2014, Diez-Roux chaired the department of epidemiology at the University of Michigan School of Public Health and directed the Center for Social Epidemiology and Population Health. Previously, she was faculty at Columbia University.

Diez-Roux was elected to the National Institute of Medicine in 2009 and is an elected member of the American Epidemiological Society, the Academy of Behavioral Medicine Research, and the National Academy of Medicine. She is a member of the Society for Epidemiologic Research and in 2021 was awarded their Kenneth Rothman Career Accomplishment Award. She has been a member of the MacArthur Network on Socioeconomic Factors and Health and co-director of the Network on Inequality, Complexity and Health. Since 2017 she has led the Wellcome Trust-funded network on “Making Cities Healthier, More Equitable and Environmentally Sustainable: Lessons from Latin America.” Diez Roux convened the Network for Urban Health in Latin America and the Caribbean which focuses on promoting research, training, and policies to promote urban health throughout the region.
