= Actuarial present value =

Expected present value of life-contingent cash flows

The actuarial present value (APV) is the expected value of the present value of future payments whose timing or amount depends on uncertain events such as survival or death.

In actuarial science, APVs are used to value benefits and premiums for products such as life insurance and life annuities under stated assumptions about interest and about survival and death probabilities, often taken from a life table.

APVs can be defined in discrete or continuous time depending on the payment timing and modelling convention, and are commonly expressed using standard actuarial notation for life-contingent contracts.

== Definition and notation ==
An actuarial present value is defined as the expected value of a present value random variable that represents the discounted value of the contract's future payments under stated interest and mortality assumptions.

Discounting is commonly written using the annual effective interest rate $i$ and the discount factor $v$, with time measured in years. Under a constant force of interest $\delta$, the same discounting can be expressed in exponential form.
$$v=(1+i)^{-1},\qquad v^t=(1+i)^{-t}=\exp(-\delta t)$$

In life-contingent models, $(x)$ denotes a life aged $x$. Let $G$ be the random variable for age at death, and let the future lifetime be $T_x=G-x,$ so that events such as survival to time $t$ can be written in terms of $T_x$.

Survival and death probabilities are often written using standard actuarial notation based on life table conventions. In particular, for $t\ge 0$ the survival probability is ${}_t p_x=\Pr(T_x>t)$. In discrete-time models, one-year death probabilities are written $q_{x+t},$ and in continuous-time models the force of mortality $\mu_{x+t}$ may be used to express the density of $T_x$ as follows:
$$f_{T_x}(t)={}_t p_x\,\mu_{x+t}.$$

== Life insurance ==
Whole life insurance pays a pre-determined benefit either at or soon after the insured's death. The symbol (x) is used to denote "a life aged x" where x is a non-random parameter that is assumed to be greater than zero. The actuarial present value of one unit of whole life insurance issued to (x) is denoted by the symbol $\,A_x$ or $\,\overline{A}_x$ in actuarial notation. Let G>0 (the "age at death") be the random variable that models the age at which an individual, such as (x), will die. And let T (the future lifetime random variable) be the time elapsed between age-x and whatever age (x) is at the time the benefit is paid (even though (x) is most likely dead at that time). Since T is a function of G and x we will write T=T(G,x). Finally, let Z be the present value random variable of a whole life insurance benefit of 1 payable at time T. Then:

$$\,Z=v^T=(1+i)^{-T} = e^{-\delta T}$$

where i is the effective annual interest rate and δ is the equivalent force of interest.

To determine the actuarial present value of the benefit we need to calculate the expected value $\,E(Z)$ of this random variable Z. Suppose the death benefit is payable at the end of year of death. Then T(G, x) := ceiling(G - x) is the number of "whole years" (rounded upwards) lived by (x) beyond age x, so that the actuarial present value of one unit of insurance is given by:

$$\begin{align} A_x  &=  E[Z]   =  E[v^T]  \\
&=  \sum_{t=1}^\infty v^{t}  Pr[T = t]  =  \sum_{t=0}^\infty v^{t+1}  Pr[T(G, x) = t+1]   \\
&=  \sum_{t=0}^\infty v^{t+1} Pr[t < G - x \leq t+1 \mid G > x] \\
&=  \sum_{t=0}^\infty v^{t+1} \left(\frac{Pr[G>x+t]}{Pr[G>x]}\right)\left(\frac{Pr[x+t<G\leq x+t+1]}{Pr[G>x+t]}\right) \\
&=  \sum_{t=0}^\infty v^{t+1} {}_t p_x \cdot q_{x+t}  \end{align}$$

where ${}_t p_x$ is the probability that (x) survives to age x+t, and $\,q_{x+t}$ is the probability that (x+t) dies within one year.

If the benefit is payable at the moment of death, then T(G,x): = G - x and the actuarial present value of one unit of whole life insurance is calculated as

$$\,\overline{A}_x\! = E[v^T] = \int_0^\infty v^t f_T(t)\,dt = \int_0^\infty v^t\,_tp_x\mu_{x+t}\,dt,$$

where $f_T$ is the probability density function of T, $\,_tp_x$ is the probability of a life age $x$ surviving to age $x + t$ and $\mu_{x+t}$ denotes force of mortality at time $x+t$ for a life aged $x$.

The actuarial present value of one unit of an n-year term insurance policy payable at the moment of death can be found similarly by integrating from 0 to n.

The actuarial present value of an n year pure endowment insurance benefit of 1 payable after n years if alive, can be found as

$$\,_nE_x = Pr[G > x + n]v^n = \,_np_xv^n$$

In practice the information available about the random variable G (and in turn T) may be drawn from life tables, which give figures by year. For example, a three year term life insurance of $100,000 payable at the end of year of death has actuarial present value

$$100,000 \,A_{\stackrel 1 x :{\overline 3|}} = 100,000 \sum_{t=1}^{3} v^{t} Pr[T(G,x) = t]$$

For example, suppose that there is a 90% chance of an individual surviving any given year (i.e. T has a geometric distribution with parameter p = 0.9 and the set {1, 2, 3, ...} for its support). Then

$$Pr[T(G,x)=1]=0.1, \quad Pr[T(G,x)=2]=0.9(0.1)=0.09, \quad Pr[T(G,x)=3]=0.9^2(0.1) = 0.081,$$

and at interest rate 6% the actuarial present value of one unit of the three year term insurance is

$$\,A_{\stackrel 1 x :{\overline 3|}} = 0.1(1.06)^{-1} + 0.09(1.06)^{-2} + 0.081(1.06)^{-3} = 0.24244846,$$

so the actuarial present value of the $100,000 insurance is $24,244.85.

In practice the benefit may be payable at the end of a shorter period than a year, which requires an adjustment of the formula.

== Life annuity ==
The actuarial present value of a life annuity of 1 per year paid continuously can be found in two ways:

Aggregate payment technique (taking the expected value of the total present value):

This is similar to the method for a life insurance policy. This time the random variable Y is the total present value random variable of an annuity of 1 per year, issued to a life aged x, paid continuously as long as the person is alive, and is given by:

$$Y=\overline{a}_{\overline{T(x)|}} = \frac{1-(1+i)^{-T}}{\delta} = \frac{1-v^T(x)}{\delta},$$

where T=T(x) is the future lifetime random variable for a person age x. The expected value of Y is:

$$\,\overline{a}_x = \int_0^\infty \overline{a}_{\overline{t|}} f_T(t)\,dt = \int_0^\infty \overline{a}_{\overline{t|}} \,_tp_x\mu_{x+t}\,dt.$$

Current payment technique (taking the total present value of the function of time representing the expected values of payments):

$$\,\overline{a}_x =\int_0^\infty v^{t} [1-F_T(t)]\,dt= \int_0^\infty v^{t} \,_tp_x\,dt$$

where F(t) is the cumulative distribution function of the random variable T.

The equivalence follows also from integration by parts.

In practice life annuities are not paid continuously. If the payments are made at the end of each period the actuarial present value is given by

$$a_x = \sum_{t=1}^\infty v^t [1-F_T(t)] = \sum_{t=1}^\infty v^t \,_tp_x.$$

Keeping the total payment per year equal to 1, the longer the period, the smaller the present value is due to two effects:

- The payments are made on average half a period later than in the continuous case.
- There is no proportional payment for the time in the period of death, i.e. a "loss" of payment for on average half a period.

Conversely, for contracts costing an equal lumpsum and having the same internal rate of return, the longer the period between payments, the larger the total payment per year.

== Life assurance as a function of the life annuity ==
Under the standard discrete-time conventions used above, the present value of a unit whole life insurance benefit payable at the end of the year of death and the present value of a unit whole life annuity-due payable while the life is alive satisfy a simple identity based on the geometric-series form of discounting.

Let $v=(1+i)^{-1}$ and let $d=i/(1+i)=1-v$ be the annual effective rate of discount. With curtate future lifetime $K_x$, the present value random variables satisfy:
$$d\sum_{k=0}^{K_x} v^k+v^{K_x+1}=1.$$

Taking expectations gives the corresponding relationship between actuarial present values, where $A_x$ is the unit whole life insurance actuarial present value and $\ddot{a}_x$ is the unit whole life annuity-due actuarial present value:
$$A_x+d\,\ddot{a}_x=1.$$

Since $a_x=\ddot{a}_x-1$ for the annuity-immediate, an equivalent form of the relationship is:
$$A_x=v-d\,a_x.$$

In continuous-time models with constant force of interest $\delta$, an analogous identity links the unit whole life insurance payable at the moment of death and the continuous life annuity payable while the life is alive. On the level of present value random variables, $\delta\int_0^{T_x}\exp(-\delta t)\,dt+\exp(-\delta T_x)=1$, and taking expectations gives:
$$\bar{A}_x+\delta\,\bar{a}_x=1.$$

== See also ==
- Actuarial science
- Actuarial notation
- Actuarial reserve
- Actuary
- Life table
- Present value
