= Force of mortality =

Function in actuarial science

In actuarial science and demography, force of mortality, also known as death intensity, is a function, usually written $\mu(x)$, that gives the instantaneous rate at which deaths occur at age x, conditional on survival to age x. In survival analysis it corresponds to the hazard function, and in reliability theory it corresponds to the failure rate. It has units of inverse time, and integrating it over an interval gives the survival probability over that interval.

== Definition ==
Let $X$ be a non-negative random variable representing an individual's age at death (or lifetime). Write $F(x)=\Pr(X\le x)$ for its cumulative distribution function and $S(x)=\Pr(X>x)$ for its survival function.

The force of mortality at age $x$, written $\mu(x)$, is defined as the instantaneous conditional rate of death at age $x$. Formally, it is the limit of the conditional probability of dying in a short interval after $x$, divided by the interval length:
$$\mu(x)=\lim_{\Delta x\to 0^+}\frac{\Pr(x<X\le x+\Delta x\mid X>x)}{\Delta x}.$$

When $X$ is continuous with probability density function $f(x)$, the force of mortality can be written in terms of $f$ and $S$ as
$$\mu(x)=\frac{f(x)}{S(x)}=\frac{f(x)}{1-F(x)}.$$

Equivalently, where $S$ is differentiable, it is the negative derivative of the log-survival function:
$$\mu(x)=-\frac{\mathrm{d}}{\mathrm{d}x}\ln S(x).$$

== Interpretation and related quantities ==
The force of mortality $\mu(x)$ is an instantaneous rate rather than a probability. For a short interval $\Delta x$, the conditional probability of dying shortly after age $x$ is approximately $\mu(x)\,\Delta x$, provided $\Delta x$ is small enough that the rate does not change much over the interval.

In survival analysis, $\mu(x)$ is the hazard function. In reliability theory, the same mathematical object is commonly called the failure rate.

The cumulative force of mortality (also called the cumulative hazard) is the integral of the force over age. Writing
$$H(x)=\int_0^x \mu(u)\,\mathrm{d}u$$
then the survival function can be expressed as
$$S(x)=\exp\!\bigl(-H(x)\bigr).$$

These identities imply the differential relationship
$$\frac{\mathrm{d}}{\mathrm{d}x}S(x)=-\mu(x)\,S(x)$$
and, for a continuous lifetime distribution, the density can be written as
$$f(x)=\mu(x)\,S(x).$$

== Survival probabilities and life tables ==
In actuarial notation, the probability that a life aged $x$ survives for a further $t$ years is written ${}_tp_x$. In terms of the lifetime random variable $X$, it is
$${}_tp_x=\Pr(X>x+t\mid X>x)=\frac{S(x+t)}{S(x)}.$$

Using the force of mortality, this conditional survival probability can be expressed as an exponential of the integrated force:
$${}_tp_x=\exp\!\left(-\int_x^{x+t}\mu(u)\,\mathrm{d}u\right).$$

Life tables often tabulate survival and death probabilities at integer ages. In that setting, the one-year survival probability is $p_x={}_1p_x$ and the one-year death probability is $q_x=1-p_x$. The force of mortality provides a continuous-age description that can be used to relate probabilities over different intervals through the integral relationship above.

== Examples of mortality models ==
Several parametric models are used to describe how the force of mortality varies with age. A constant force of mortality, $\mu(x)=\lambda$ for $\lambda>0$, corresponds to an exponential distribution for $X$ and gives a memoryless survival pattern.

In actuarial work, the Gompertz–Makeham law of mortality is often written as the sum of an age-independent component and an exponentially increasing component, for example
$$\mu(x)=A+B\,c^x$$
with $A\ge 0$, $B>0$, and $c>1$. The Gompertz model is the special case $A=0$, giving:
$$\mu(x)=B\,c^x$$

A common model in survival analysis and reliability uses a Weibull hazard, which has the form
$$\mu(x)=\frac{k}{\lambda}\left(\frac{x}{\lambda}\right)^{k-1}$$
for shape $k>0$ and scale $\lambda>0$. This family includes decreasing, constant, and increasing forces of mortality depending on the value of $k$.

== See also ==
- Failure rate
- Hazard function
- Actuarial present value
- Actuarial science
- Reliability theory
- Life expectancy
