= List of actuaries =

An actuary is a business professional who deals with a financial situation of risk and uncertainty. This is a list of notable actuaries and others who have influenced the profession.

== Born in the 17th century ==
- John Graunt (1620–1674), English, constructed one of the first life tables
- William Petty (1623–1687), English, much early writing on life tables
- Johan de Witt (1625–1672), Dutch, early pioneering work on life annuities
- Edmond Halley (1656–1742), English, constructed one of the first life tables

== Born in the 18th century ==
- James Dodson (1705–1751), English, developed statistical mortality tables
- Alexander Webster (1708–1784), Scottish, developed a scheme for providing pensions to widows of church ministers
- Richard Price (1723–1791), Welsh, introduced correct methods for values of contingent reversions
- Edward Rowe Mores (1731–1778), English, founder of The Society for Equitable Assurances on Lives and Survivorships and the first person to use the professional title "actuary"
- William Morgan (1750–1833), Welsh
- George Barrett (1752–1821), English
- Nathaniel Bowditch (1773–1838), probably the second American insurance actuary; Essex Fire and Marine
- Joshua Milne (1776–1851), English
- Benjamin Gompertz (1779–1865), English, developed the Gompertz-Makeham law of mortality and the Gompertz function
- John Finlaison (1783–1860), Scottish, first president of the Institute of Actuaries
- Griffith Davies (1788–1855), Welsh
- Thomas Galloway (1796–1851), Scottish

== Born in the 19th century ==
- Elizur Wright (1804–1885), American, campaigned for valuation laws requiring life insurance companies to hold reserves to guarantee payment of benefits
- Wesley S. B. Woolhouse (1809–1893), English, co-founder of the Institute of Actuaries
- James Joseph Sylvester (1814–1897), English
- Ole Jacob Broch (1818–1889), Norwegian, founded Christiania almindelige gjensidige Forsørgelsesanstalt, Scandinavia's first life insurance company
- Ernst Engel (1821–1896), German, founded the first mortgage insurance company at Dresden
- Thomas Bond Sprague (1830–1920), British
- Esprit Jouffret (1837–1904), French
- Thorvald N. Thiele (1838–1910), Danish
- Emory McClintock (1840–1916), American
- Anders Lindstedt (1854–1939), Swedish
- Thomas Bassett Macaulay (1860–1942), Canadian
- Thomas Jaffrey (1861–1953), Scottish
- Miles Menander Dawson (1863–1942), American
- Gabriel Gabrielsen Holtsmark (1867–1954), Norwegian
- George James Lidstone (1870–1952), British
- Joseph Burn (1871–1950), English
- Johan Frederik Steffensen (1873–1961), Danish
- Alexander Jobson (1875–1933), Australian
- Maurice Princet (1875–1973), French
- Henry Louis Rietz (1875–1943), American
- I. M. Rubinow (1875–1936), Russian
- Alfred M. Best (1876–1958), American, founder of the A. M. Best company
- Filip Lundberg (1876–1965), Swedish, founder of mathematical risk theory and managing director of several insurance companies
- William Palin Elderton (1877–1962), English
- Alfred J. Lotka (1880–1949), American
- Sverre Krogh (1883–1957), Norwegian
- Harald Cramér (1893–1985), Swedish, developed numerous statistical theories and methods
- Ivo Lah (1896–1979), Slovene
- Dorothy Spiers (1897–1977), first woman to qualify as an actuary in the United Kingdom
- Henrik Palmstrøm (1900–1998), Norwegian

== Born in the 20th century ==
- Oswald Jacoby (1902–1984), American, youngest person to pass four examinations of the Society of Actuaries
- Pedro Teotónio Pereira (1902–1972), Portuguese
- Wendell Milliman (1905–1976), American, co-founder of Milliman & Robertson
- Andreas Tømmerbakke (1905–1994), Norwegian
- Bruno de Finetti (1906–1985), Italian
- Frank Redington (1906–1984), English, developed a theory concerning the immunisation of fixed-income portfolios
- Bernard Benjamin (1910–2002), English
- Cecil J. Nesbitt (1912–2001), Canadian
- Stuart A. Robertson (1918–2005), American, co-founder of Milliman & Robertson
- James C. Hickman (1927–2006), American
- Harvey Milk (1930-1978), American
- David Wilkie (1934-), British, developer of the Wilkie Model
- Hugh Hedley Scurfield (1935–2020), English
- Phelim Boyle (1941–), Northern Irish
- Jeremy Gold, (1942–2018), American
- Paul McCrossan (1942–), Canadian
- Ed Savitz (1942–1993), American
- Ward Whitt (1942–), American
- Howard Winklevoss (1943–), American
- Robert Astley (1944–), Canadian
- Bryn Davies (1944–), British
- Christopher Daykin (1948–), English
- Steven Haberman (1951–), English
- James Robert Crosby (1956–), English
- Terri Vaughan (1956–), American
- Tan Suee Chieh (1959–), Singaporean
- David X. Li (~1960s), Chinese, advanced the use of Gaussian copula models to price collateralized debt obligations
- Michael Shackleford (1965–), English
- Roelof Botha (1973–), South African
