= William Pocock =

William Pocock may refer to:

- William Pocock (cricketer), English cricketer
- William Innes Pocock (1783–1836), British navy officer and artist
- William Fuller Pocock (1779–1849), English architect.
- William Willmer Pocock, British architect
- Bill Pocock, English footballer
