= Trevor Square =

Neighbourhood in Knightsbridge, London

Coordinates: 51.500479°N 0.164751°W

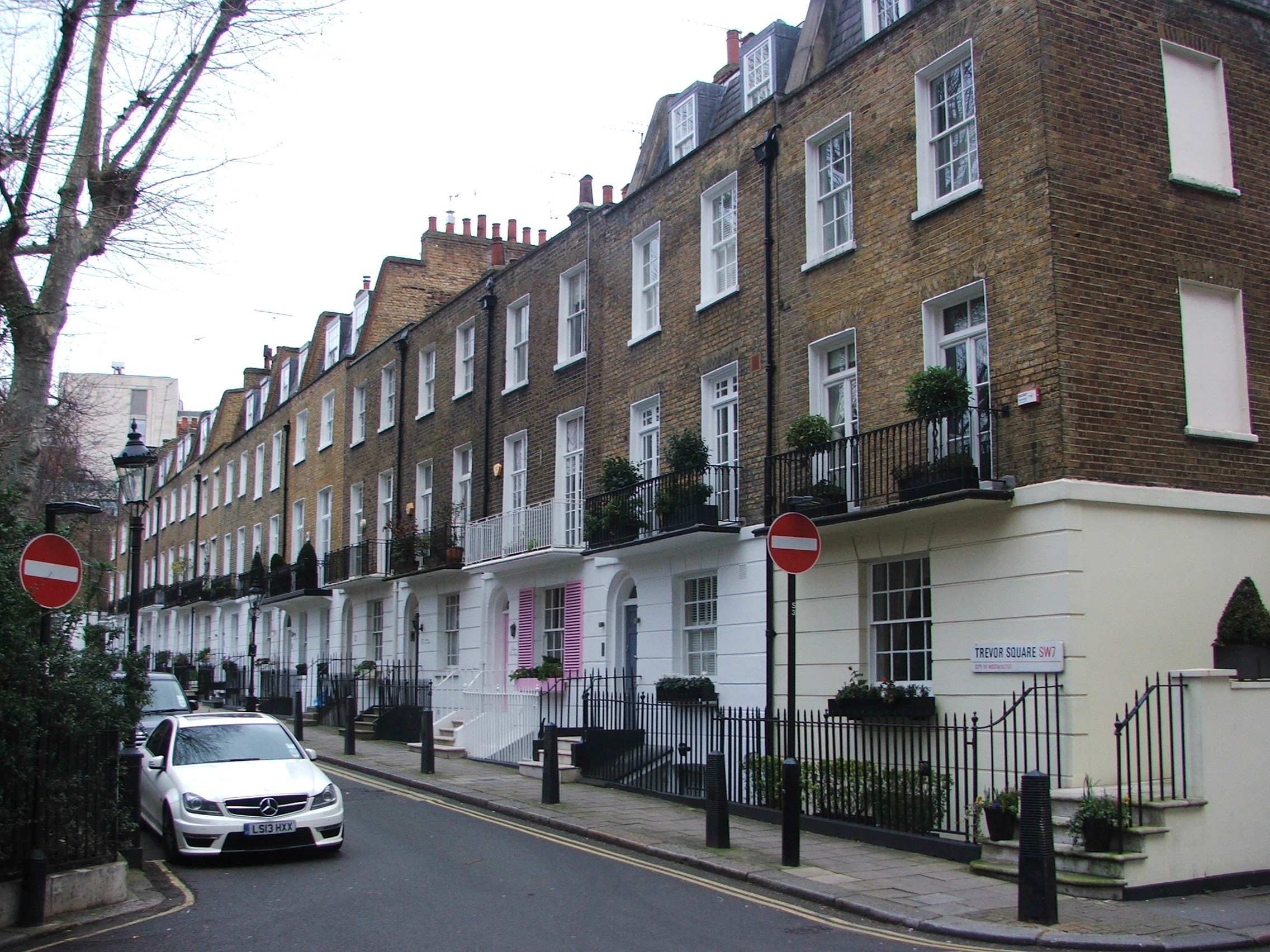
Trevor Square, Knightsbridge

Trevor Square is an elongated garden square in Knightsbridge, London. It was designed in the 1810s chiefly by architect William Fuller Pocock, and the mid-rise, basemented houses fronting its two long sides, with slate mansard roofs are listed in the British protective and recognising scheme, and were built in the 1820s. The main stonemason employed was Lancelot Edward Wood after whom is named neighbouring street Lancelot Place (originally Petwin Place).

== Location ==
It is in the west of Knightbridge, north of Brompton Road, in Anglican terms it is in South Kensington but historically the parish near-equated to the detached part of St Margaret's Westminster, which explains the present borough. The nearest public transit station is Knightsbridge tube station.

== History ==
Crop of Christopher and John Greenwood's 8 inch-to-mile map published in 1827 from an 1830 republication (click to view all). In the far west is what became Rutland Gate

The square was mainly detailed from 1810 by architect William Fuller Pocock and later, less so, by his son William Willmer Pocock. The blueprint was approved by fellow architect Philip Hardwick. Arthur Hill-Trevor, 3rd Viscount Dungannon agreed to demolish his Powis House in 1811 to make way for the new development. The first houses were completed in 1820; most of them were completed by 1827.

In 1816, Rev. John Morison established the Trevor Chapel, later known as the Trevor Congregational Church on the corner of Lancelot Place. This closed in 1902 to be replaced by a Harrods showroom.

By 1911, the minor, overarching legal interest (reversion) of the square's garden and any buildings enjoyed on long leases (by others) belonged to J. C. Humphreys.

== Layout and appearance ==
The square is open, at its north end, into a broad backstreet, Trevor Street, of similar house design and date, at an alike length as the square ending at a broad road then Hyde Park Barracks, London, which are set against Hyde Park. A corner house to an adjacent street, Trevor Place, Hill House reflects the Hill-Trevor land ownership before the square was built.

On the south side a fractionally recessed block takes up a small tapering block of buildings (No.s 17-18) indented by a rear parking access. The square has an outlying set of numbering to the west alongside this, a very large building known as No.s 19-22. The highest number is No. 38, set across an access road on a north-west corner.

The fronts of both very dominant (vast bulk of the rectangle) sides have with light-painted, quasi stone-clad in ashlar blocks (rusticated) lower floors and yellow- or brown- brick upper floors. Decoration is given by black railings, broad steps, arched doorways, panelled sash windows in recessed, quite heavy white frames, window boxes, and entrance-floor-matching under-painted balconies supporting small mediterranean-style trees, among other classically graceful features. The gardens (at centre) are a private, communal, planted contrast to the skirting, backstreet road.

== Listed buildings ==
All of the long sides (No.s 1-16 and 23–38) are listed Grade II (that is, in the initial mainstream category) on the National Heritage List for England, giving statutory protection and recognition for architecture and/or age.

== Notable residents ==
Group Captain Harry Day, GC, DSO, OBE, (3 August 1898 – 11 March 1977), RAF officer and serial escaper from German POW camps in the Second World War, lived for much of his life at Number 8.

The early aviator Gustav Hamel lived at Number 15, before his disappearance and presumed death in 1914.
