= McPhun =

McPhun is a surname. Notable people with the surname include:

- Frances McPhun (1880–1940), Scottish suffragette
- John McPhun (born 1940), Rhodesian cricketer
- Margaret McPhun (1876–1960), Scottish suffragette
