= Annie S. Swan =

Scottish writer (1859–1943)

Annie S. Swan CBE
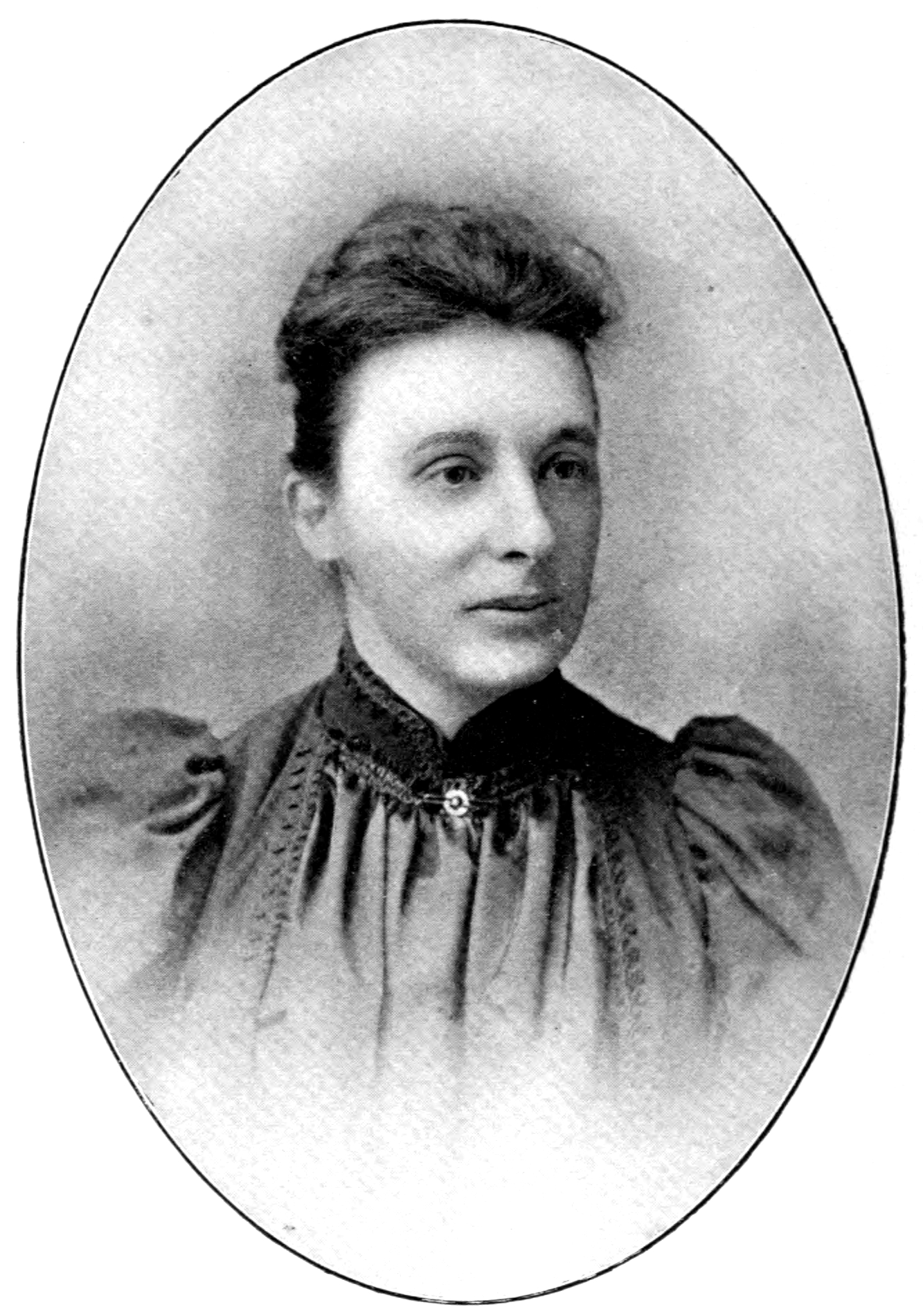
- Born: Annie Shepherd Swan; 8 July 1859; Mountskip, Gorebridge, Scotland
- Died: 17 June 1943 (aged 83); Gullane, East Lothian, Scotland
- Occupations: Writer, novelist, journalist
- Spouse: James Burnett Smith (1883–1927)
- Writing career
- Pen name: Annie S. Swan, Annie S. Smith, David Lyall, Mrs Burnett-Smith
- Genres: Fiction, dramatic fiction, romantic fiction, non-fiction, advice, feminism, politics, religion, social commentary
- Notable work: Aldersyde (1884)

Annie Shepherd Swan, CBE (8 July 1859 – 17 June 1943) was a Scottish journalist and fiction writer. She wrote mainly under her maiden name, but also as David Lyall and later Mrs Burnett Smith. A writer of romantic fiction for women, she had over 200 novels, serials, stories and other fiction published between 1878 and her death. She has been called "one of the most commercially successful popular novelists of the later nineteenth and early twentieth centuries". Swan was politically active in the First World War, and as a suffragist, a Liberal activist and founder-member and vice-president of the Scottish National Party.

== Early life ==
Swan was born on 8 July 1859 in Mountskip, Gorebridge, Scotland. She was one of the seven children of Edward Swan (died 1893), a farmer and merchant, by his first wife, Euphemia Brown (died 1881). After her father's business failed, she attended school in Edinburgh, latterly at Queen Street Ladies College. Her father belonged to an Evangelical Union congregation, but she turned in adulthood to the Church of Scotland. She persistently wrote fiction as a teenager.

== Writings ==
Her first publication was Wrongs Righted (1881), as a serial in The People's Friend. This periodical she long saw as the mainstay of her career, although she contributed to many others.

The novel that made her reputation was Aldersyde (1883), a romance set in the Scottish Borders that was favourably reviewed. Swan received an autographed letter of appreciation from Lord Tennyson. Prime Minister William Ewart Gladstone wrote to The Scotsman that he thought it "beautiful as a work of art" for its "truly living sketches of Scottish character".

Later successes such as The Gates of Eden (1887) and Maitland of Lauriston (1891) owed a debt to the fiction of Margaret Oliphant, who was among her critics, accusing Swan's novels of presenting a stereotypical, unrealistic depiction of Scotland. In a review of Carlowrie (1884), Oliphant went so far as to say Swan "presented an entirely distorted view of Scottish life." Because of her dominance over The Woman at Home, editor-in-chief W. R. Nicoll often called it Annie Swan's Magazine. She became editor of the magazine from 1893 to 1917. While writing for the British Weekly, she became acquainted with S. R. Crockett and J. M. Barrie, whose work like hers was given the unflattering epithet kailyard, an allusion to its parochialism and sentimentality.

By 1898, Swan had published over 30 books, mainly novels, many published serially. She also wrote poetry, stories and books on advice, politics and religion. In 1901, The Juridical Review reported that Swan's books were the most favoured by female inmates in Irish prisons. In 1906, she was profiled in Helen Black's Notable Women Authors of the Day. She is named as the favourite novelist of William Morel's sweetheart Lily in D. H. Lawrence's Sons and Lovers (1913).

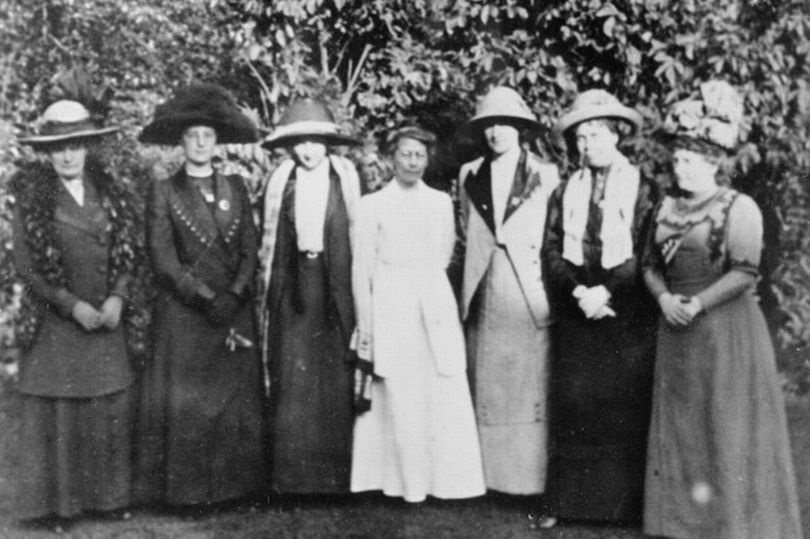
(L to R) Helen Crawfurd, Janet Barrowman, Margaret McPhun, Mrs A. A. Wilson, Frances McPhun, Nancy A. John and Annie Swan.

Swan used her maiden name for most of her career, but occasionally the pseudonyms David Lyall and later Mrs Burnett Smith. She was a respected public speaker involved in social and political causes such as the Temperance movement. She wrote books and novels on the suffragist movement in Britain, often as David Lyall, such as Margaret Holroyd: or, the Pioneers (1910). The novel used interconnecting stories that followed a young suffragette, Margaret Holroyd, and dealt with many real problems faced by suffragettes and suffragists, such as disapproval of family and friends, fear of public speaking, physical exhaustion and ethical dilemmas in a rebellious, sometimes militant atmosphere.

She was involved in the Women's Suffrage movement herself, and was arrested during a window smashing raid in London, alongside a number of other Scottish women.

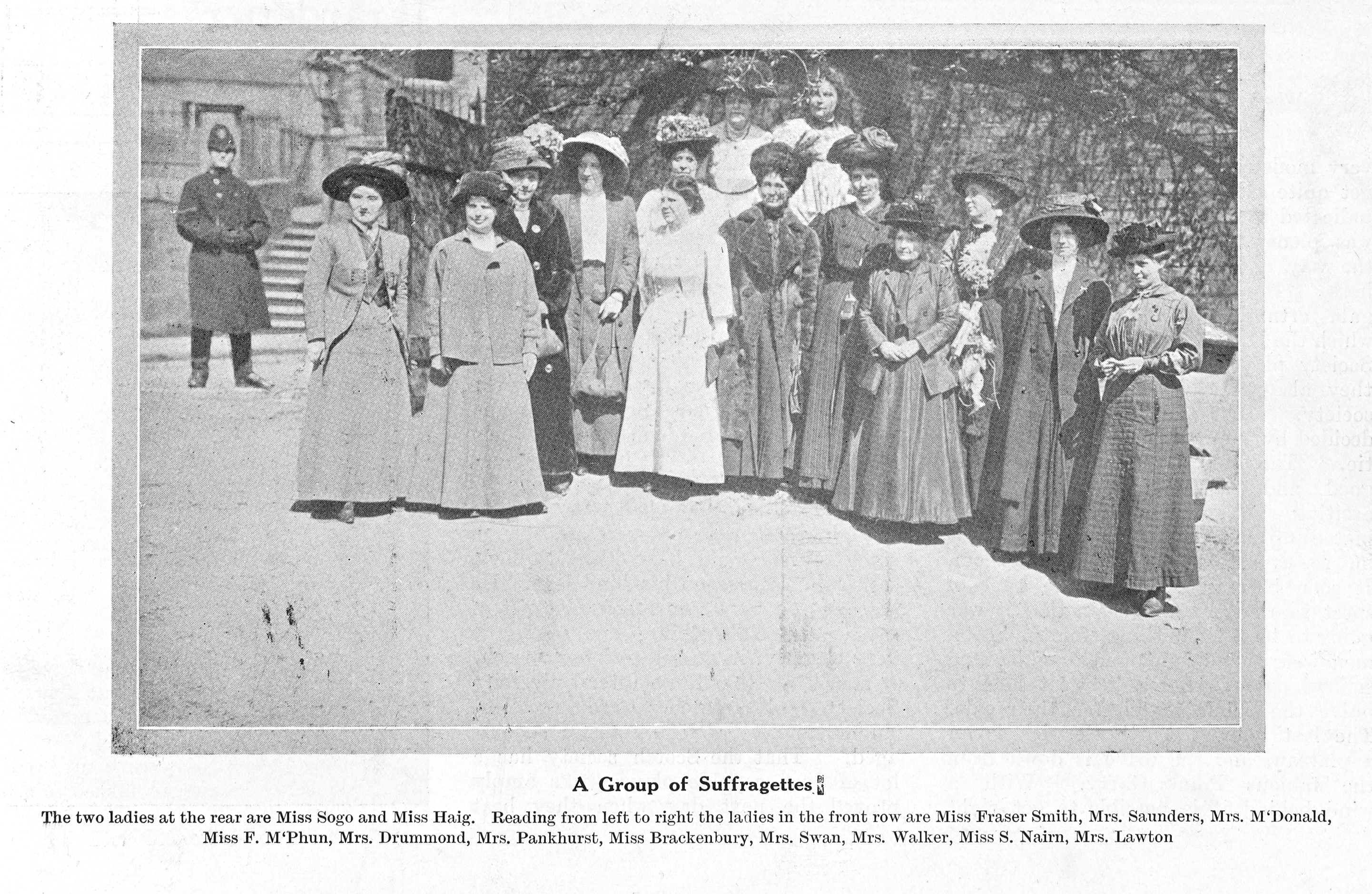
Group photograph of Suffragettes at Bazaar in Glasgow in 1910

From 1924 Swan ran another penny weekly, The Annie Swan Annual. She also wrote several popular novels at this time including The Last of the Laidlaws (1920), Closed Doors (1926) and The Pendulum (1926). After her husband's death in 1927, Swan returned to Scotland, settling in Gullane, East Lothian. In 1930, she received a CBE for her contribution to literature. She remained in politics, becoming a founding member of the Scottish National Party and its vice president.

== Personal life ==
Swan married the schoolteacher James Burnett Smith (1857–1927) in 1883. They lived initially at Star of Markinch, Fife, where she befriended the Scottish theologian Robert Flint and his sister. They moved two years later to Morningside, Edinburgh, where Burnett Smith became a medical student, and in 1893 to London, where their two children, Effie (1893–1973) and Eddie (born 1896), were born.

While in London they became friends and neighbours with the writer Beatrice Harraden and with Joseph and Emma Parker at a later date in Hampstead. The family moved to Hertford in 1908, where her son Eddie died in a shooting accident in September 1910.

Swan's autobiography My Life appeared in 1934 and was reprinted six times within a year. Her final published work was an article for Homes and Gardens, "Testament of Age", in March 1943. She died of heart disease three months later at her home in Gullane, on 17 June 1943. A collection of her personal correspondence, The Letters of Annie S. Swan (1945) edited by Mildred Robertson Nicoll appeared two years later.

== Public life ==
During the First World War, Swan resigned her editorial position and volunteered for the British war effort. She went to France on a morale-boosting tour and also worked with Belgian refugees. Swan visited the United States in January 1918 and again after the armistice at the end of the year. There she met Herbert Hoover, then head of the U.S. Food Administration and lectured on the need to conserve food on the American home front and informed the American public of Britain's wartime contributions. Two successful plays, Getting Together by John Hay Beith and The Better 'Ole by Bruce Bairnsfather, were written for the occasion. While in the United States, she also wrote a book on the cultural differences between women in Britain and the United States entitled: As Others See Her: An Englishwoman's Impressions of the American Woman in War Time (1919).

Swan was an active Liberal throughout her life and became a well-known suffragist. Shortly after the Representation of the People Act 1918 gave women the vote in Britain, she was the first female candidate, standing unsuccessfully for the Maryhill division of Glasgow in the general election of 1922. Of 32 female candidates across Britain in that general election, only two were returned.

Annie Burnett Smith

General Election 1922: Glasgow Maryhill Electorate 34,622
Party	Candidate	Votes	%	±%
Labour	John William Muir	13,058	47.3	
Unionist	Sir William Mitchell-Thomson	10,951	39.6	
Liberal	Annie Burnett Smith	3,617	13.1	
Majority		2,107	7.7	

After her defeat, the Women's Freedom League claimed that Swan and other female candidates would have been elected under a system of proportional representation like those in Ireland, Netherlands and Germany. She was also a founding member and one-time vice president of the Scottish National Party.

== Later life ==
Swan's husband died in 1927 and she and her daughter moved to Gullane, East Lothian. She was made a CBE in the 1930 Birthday Honours for literary and public services. She died at her home in Gullane on 17 June 1943, aged 83.

== Posthumous reputation ==
In the years since her death, there has been little study of her life or work by literary historians. Articles such as Edmond Gardiner's "Annie S. Swan - Forerunner of Modern Popular Fiction" (1974) and Charlotte Reid's "A Cursory of Inspection to Annie S. Swan" (1990) point to her literary contributions. Several of her novels have reappeared.
