= Janet Barrowman =

Scottish suffragette (1879–1955)

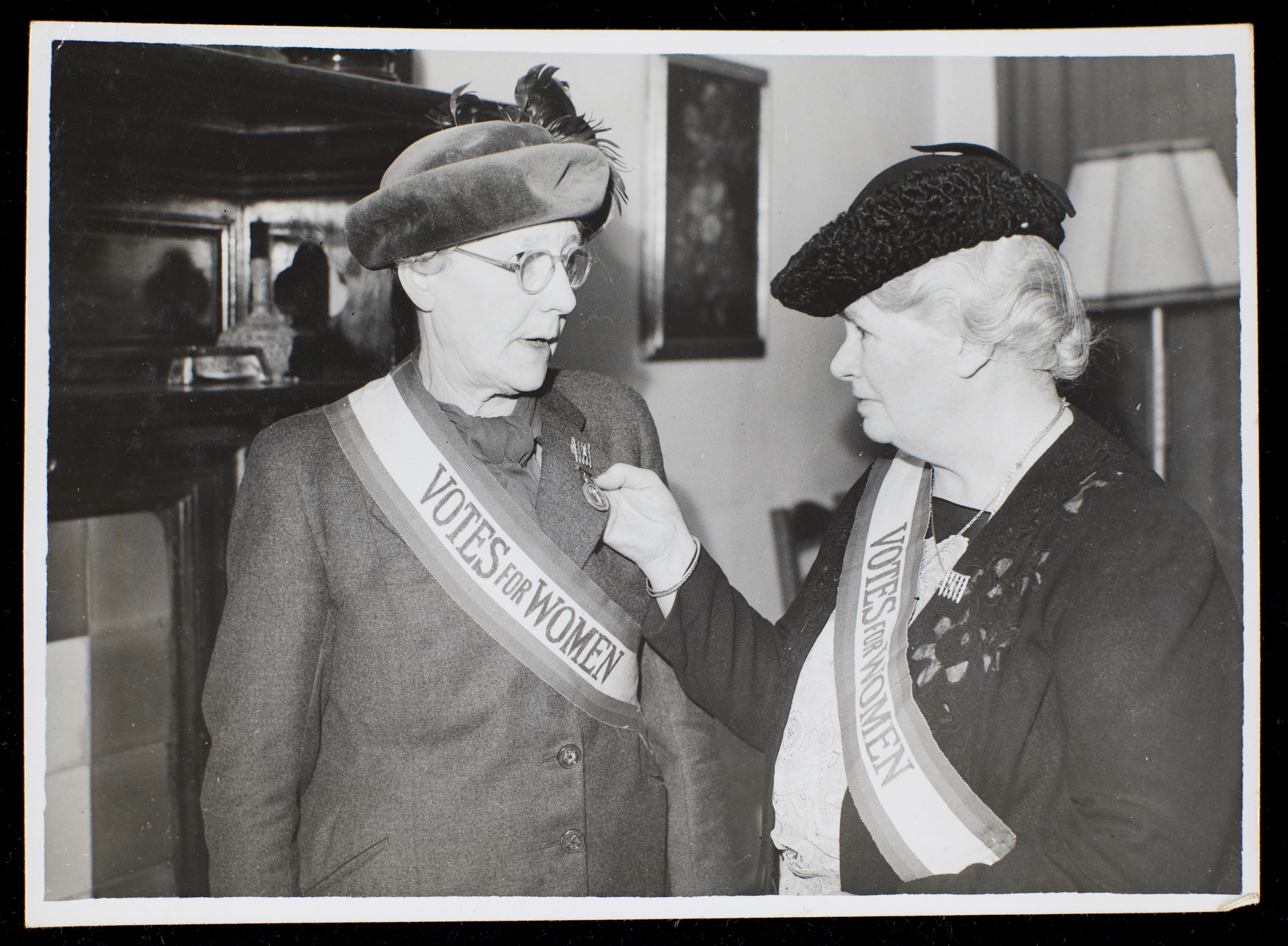
- Helen Crawfurd & Janet Barrowman
- Born: 1879; Glasgow, Scotland
- Died: 1955 (aged 75–76); Glasgow, Scotland
- Known for: Scottish suffragette

Janet Barrowman was a Scottish suffragette. She was a member of the Women's Social and Political Union (WSPU).

== Women's Suffrage ==
Barrowman was born in Glasgow. Her father was a lime merchant. She was a member of the Women's Social and Political Union.

In around 1901, Barrowman began working as a clerk for soap manufacturer, Joseph Watson & Sons.

In 1912, Barrowman participated in militant activity during the campaign for women's suffrage alongside Helen Crawfurd, Annie Swan and others, breaking a window valued at 4 shillings. She was arrested and sentenced to two months hard labour in HM Prison Holloway.

Her manager, David Wilkie, wrote to his solicitor James Orr to request intervention on her behalf, on the grounds that the sentence was disproportionate to the crime. He described his perception that Janet had been led astray by the leaders of the movement, and his fear that imprisonment would affect her health, the health of her mother, and lead to her being dismissed from the company.

During her imprisonment in Holloway, Barrowman worked with Nancy John to smuggle poetry, written by fellow suffragette prisoners, out of Holloway. These were published by the Glasgow branch of the WSPU as "Holloway Jingles" in 1912.

She lost her job as a result of her arrest, and did not take part in any more militant acts. She gained another job, as a shipping clerk, in which she worked until she retired.

== Legacy ==
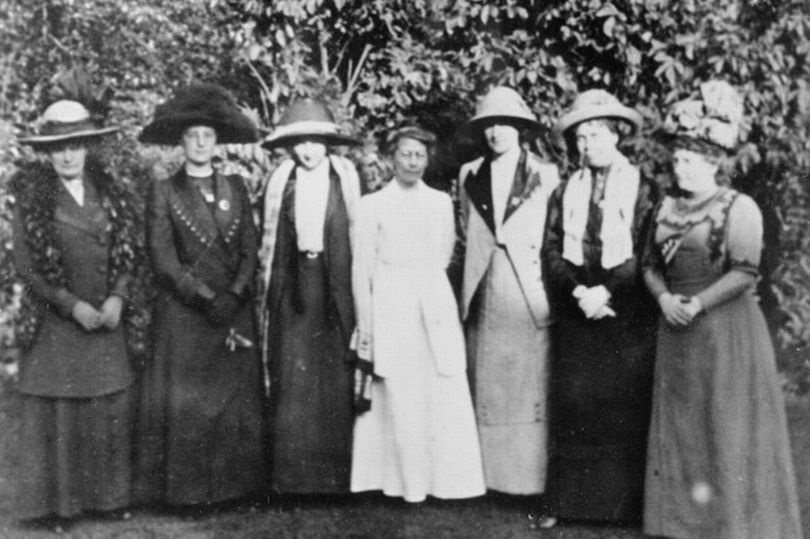
(L - R) Helen Crawfurd, Janet Barrowman, Margaret McPhun, Mrs A. A. Wilson, Frances McPhun, Nancy A. John and Annie S. Swan

Barrowman's copy of the poetry book, published by the Glasgow branch of the Women's Social and Political Union, was gifted in 1947 to Dr Charity Taylor, the governor of Holloway, and it was auctioned by Pickering and Chatto in 2018. She donated her collection of memorabilia to Glasgow Museums in 1955.

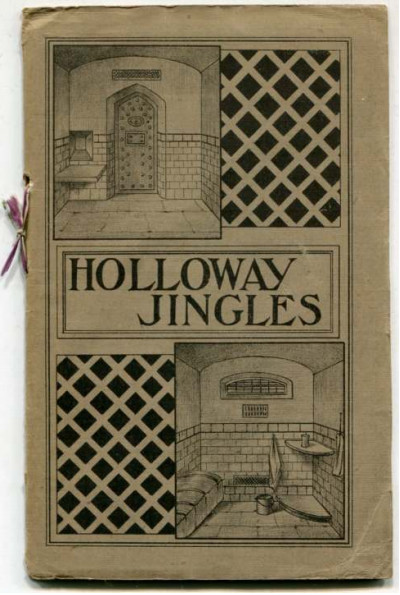
Holloway_Jingles_1912_cover

In March 1976 the historian, Brian Harrison, interviewed Barrowman's brother, Barclay Barrowman, about his sister as part of the Suffrage Interviews project, titled Oral evidence on the suffragette and suffragist movements: the Brian Harrison interviews. He describes the life of the Barrowman family, as well as Janet's character, appearance, politics, interests and hobbies. Harrison conducted a second interview about Barrowman with her cousin, Marion Thomas, in July 1977, which covers Janet's relationship with her elder sister, Mary.
