= George Epps (actuary) =

British actuary and civil servant

Sir George Epps KBE CB FIA

Government Actuary
- In office 19 May 1936 – 30 November 1944
- Preceded by: Alfred Watson

Personal details
- Born: 26 February 1885
- Died: 8 February 1951 (aged 65)

Sir George Selby Washington Epps KBE CB FIA (26 February 1885 – 8 February 1951) was a British actuary and civil servant. He succeeded Alfred Watson as government actuary in 1936.

== Early life and education ==
George Selby Washington Epps was born on 26 February 1885 to father Washington Epps, a medical doctor in Great Russell Street, London, and his mother who was a sister of Lawrence Alma-Tadema. He was educated at Highgate School from 1899 before studying the Mathematical Tripos at Emmanuel College, Cambridge, graduating with a second-class degree in 1907.

== Career ==
Epps became an actuary in 1907, having been introduced to the profession by a family friend. He started working with Alfred Watson as an actuary in government in 1912, acting as secretary to the Actuarial Advisory Committee from then until 1915. He served on various actuarial committees relating to National Insurance, including work on the implications on finance of the partition of Ireland. In 1921, he won an award for a paper he submitted to the Institute of Actuaries.

Epps served as deputy government actuary from September 1926 until May 1936, having succeeded Alfred Henry on his death, during which time he continued to serve on committees. On 19 May 1936, he succeeded Alfred Watson as government actuary on Watson's death, a role he stayed in until 30 November 1944. He served on the Beveridge Committee in 1941, as a member of the committee and as an actuarial adviser, including producing an appendix to the Beveridge Report.

He was joint honorary secretary of the Institute of Actuaries in 1928 and 1929, and vice-president of the group in 1930 and 1931.

== Personal life ==
Epps married Leonara Peacock in 1915. After his retirement, they lived in Spaxton, Somerset, where their daughter was a farmer. He died on 8 February 1951.

== Honours ==
Epps became a Fellow of the Institute of Actuaries (FIA) in 1913. He was made a Commander of the Order of the British Empire (CBE) in the 1926 Birthday Honours, before being promoted to Knight Commander of the Order of the British Empire (KBE) in the 1942 Birthday Honours. In addition, he was appointed a Companion of the Order of the Bath (CB) in the 1931 Birthday Honours.
