= William Innes Pocock =

Royal Navy officer, artist and writer

- Born: June 1783; Bristol
- Died: 13 March 1836 (aged 52); Reading
- Occupations: Royal Navy lieutenant, artist and writer

Lieutenant William Innes Pocock (June 1783 – 13 March 1836) was a Royal Navy officer, artist and writer.

City of Trieste, from the year of the siege (1813)

== Biography ==
Pocock was the second son of Nicholas Pocock, marine painter, and younger brother of Isaac Pocock, artist and dramatist. He was born at Bristol in June 1783. He entered the Royal Navy in 1795, served more especially in the East and West Indies, and from 1807 to 1810, in the St. Albans, made three several voyages to the Cape of Good Hope, St. Helena, and China. In the last of these the convoy was much shattered in a storm off the Cape of Good Hope, and was detained at St. Helena to refit. During this time Pocock made several sketches of the island, which, with some account of its history, he published as Five Views of the Island of St. Helena in 1815, when public interest was excited in the island as the residence allotted to Napoleon. On 1 Aug. 1811 Pocock was promoted to be lieutenant of the HMS Eagle, with Captain Charles Rowley, and in her saw much active boat-service during the Adriatic campaign. She was paid off in 1814, and Pocock had no further employment afloat. He appears to have amused his leisure with reading, writing, and painting; he is described as a good linguist, and is said to have published in 1815 Naval Records: consisting of a series of Engravings from Original Designs by Nicholas Pocock, illustrative of the principal Engagements at Sea since the Commencement of the War in 1793, with an Account of each Action (Watt, Bibl. Brit.). There is no copy in the British Museum. He is also said to have written some pamphlets on naval subjects, none of which seem now accessible. He has been confused with William Fuller Pocock, architect and artist. He died at Reading on 13 March 1836. He was twice married, and left issue.
