= The People's Friend =

British weekly magazine

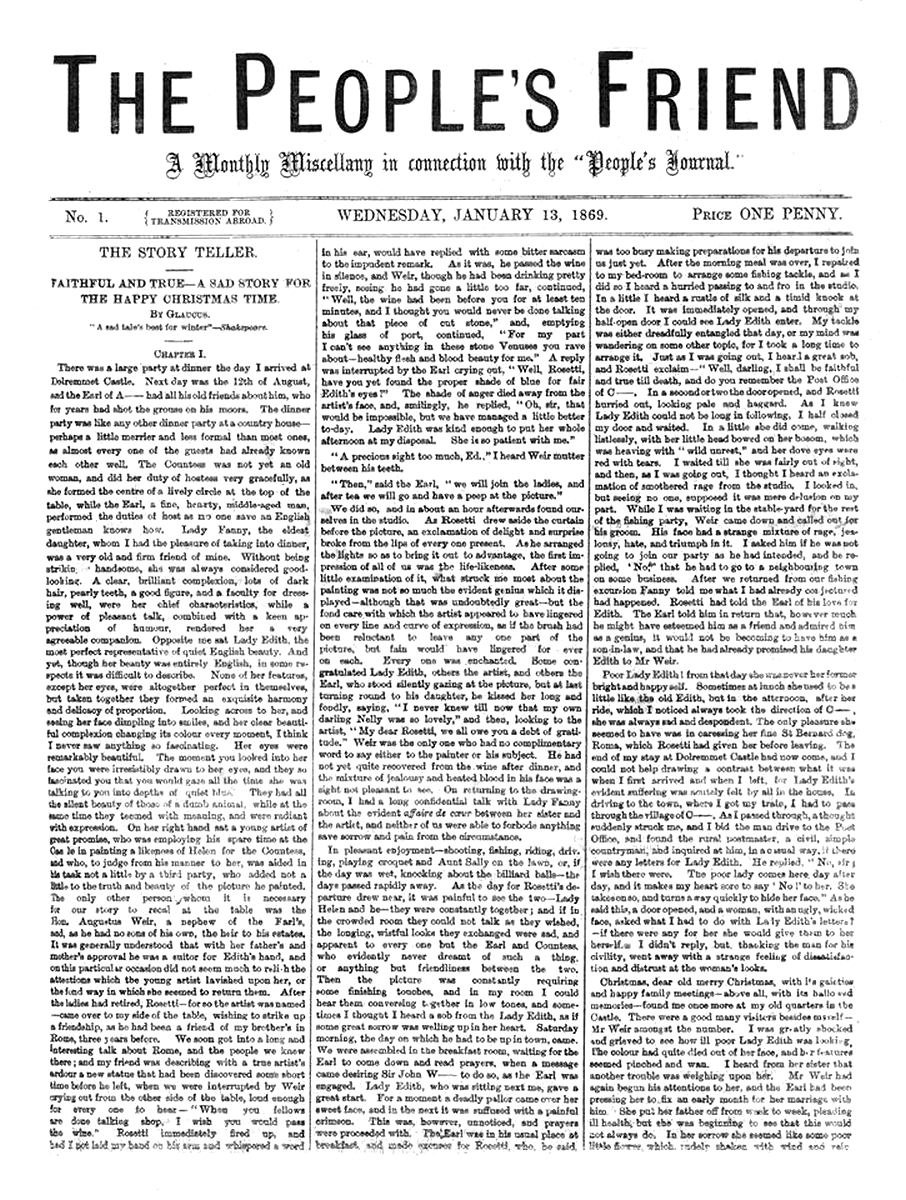
- First edition (1869)
- Editor: Stuart Johnstone
- Former editors: Angela Gilchrist
- Frequency: weekly
- Total circulation: 297,344 (June 2013)
- Founded: 1869
- First issue: 13 January 1869
- Company: D. C. Thomson & Co.
- Country: United Kingdom
- Language: English
- Website: www.thepeoplesfriend.co.uk

The People's Friend is a British weekly magazine founded by John Leng on 13 January 1869 as an offshoot of The People's Journal and currently published by D. C. Thomson & Co. Ltd. Its tagline for many years was "The famous story magazine"; it is now “The Home of Great Reading”. Originally a monthly publication, the magazine became a weekly title in 1870; it featured its first illustrated cover on 11 May 1946.

Annie S. Swan wrote for the magazine. The current editor is Stuart Johnstone.

The magazine is principally aimed at older women. Each issue contains at least seven self-contained short stories and two serials (frequently more), a craft project (usually knitting or sewing) and various factual articles, one of which is a piece on a particular town. Pets, family and traditions are also common themes. During World War 1, the focus of the magazine shifted to women.

The magazine holds an annual craft competition called "The Love Darg" (a Scots term for a day's work done without asking payment) in which readers are asked to make toys and garments. After judging, the entries are distributed to charities.

The publisher's geographical location in Dundee is reflected in the publication’s general bias toward Scottish subjects. The main front cover image is invariably a painting of a picturesque location somewhere in Britain or Ireland, and readers can also buy prints of these pictures. For many years the paintings were created by a variety of artists but always credited to the collective pseudonym “J Campbell Kerr”, which was also used for the "Round Britain" feature within the magazine.

Following a design refresh in 2024, the cover illustrations are now primarily produced by the illustrator David Young.
