= Joseph Burn =

Burn in 1932.

Sir Joseph Burn KBE, FRICS (1871–1950) was chairman of the Prudential Insurance company. He was a fellow of the Institute of Actuaries and served as the organization's president from 1926–1928. The "Sir Joseph Burn Prize" is awarded by the Institute of Actuaries to the UK student with the best performance in the actuarial exams, thereby becoming eligible to transfer to the Class of Fellow.

== Personal background ==
Burn was married to Emily H. (née Smith) Burn. They were the parents of engineer Douglas Courtney Burn, Kathleen Esther Burn, Marguerite Emily (Peggy) Barrowman nee Burn (wife of Barclay Barrowman), solicitor Maurice James Burn, and the painter, Rodney Joseph Burn.
