= Holloway Jingles =

Poetry pamphlet published by the Glasgow branch of the Women's Social and Political Union

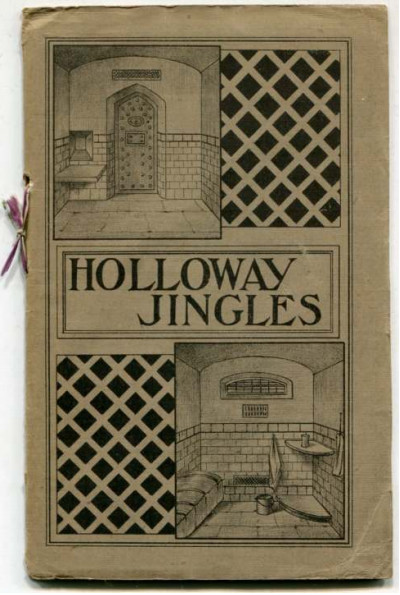
- Cover of the poetry collection
- Author: WSPU Glasgow branch
- Genre: Political poetry
- Publication date: 1912

Holloway Jingles is a collection of poetry written by a group of suffragettes who were imprisoned in Holloway jail during 1912. It was published by the Glasgow branch of the Women's Social and Political Union(WSPU). The poems were collected and edited by Nancy A John, and smuggled out of the prison by John and Janet Barrowman. The foreword was written by Theresa Gough, a journalist and active speaker for the WSPU, whose nom de plume was ‘Karmie M.T. Kranich'.

The cover depicts two drawings of a bare prison cell with a check pattern design. It was designed by Constance Moore. The publication was advertised for sale in the newspaper Votes for Women for a cost of 1 shilling. All proceeds of sales went to the WSPU.

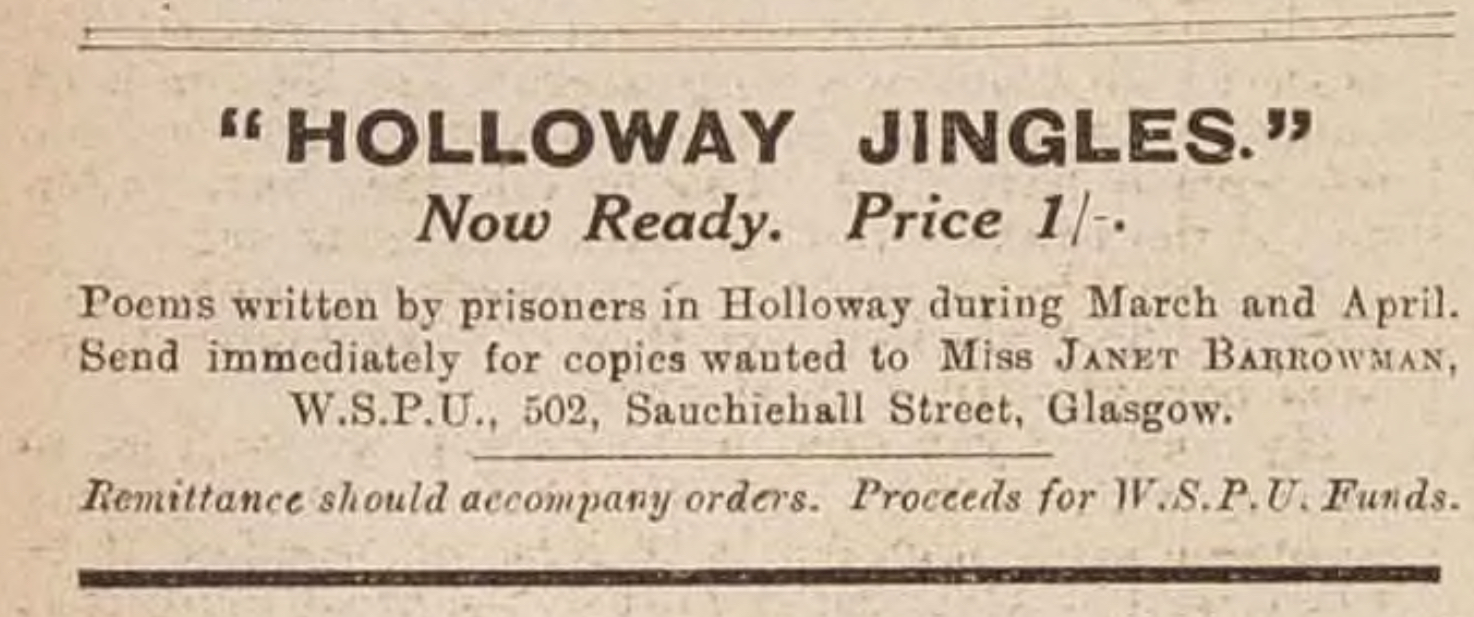
Advertisement for Holloway Jingles, a pamphlet of poetry

The poems expressed the imprisoned women's sense of solidarity and subversion, poetry itself having been regarded since the 1830s as a "dangerous form" by traditional educationists. One contributor to the collection was Emily Davison, best known for her death on Epsom Racecourse in campaigning for the vote.

The foreword reads:-

"Comrades, it is the eve of our parting. Those of us who have had the longest sentences to serve have seen many a farewell waved up towards our cell windows from the great prison gate as time after time it opened for release. The jail yard, too, where we exercise, now seems spacious, though at first it was thronged with our fellow prisoners. Yet not one of them has really left us. Whenever in through we re-enter that yard, within its high, grim walls we see each as we knew her there: our revered Leader, Mrs. Pankhurst, courageous, serene, smiling; Dr Ehel Smyth, joyous and terrific, whirling through a game of rounders with as much intentness as if she were conducting a symphony; Dr L. Garrett Anderson, in whose eyes gaiety and gravity are never far apart - but we cannot name them all, for there are scores who made that yard a pleasant place."

== Poems ==
- "The Women in prison" by Kathleen Emerson
- "Oh, who are these in scant array", by Kathleen Emerson
- "To a fellow prisoner" (Miss Janie Allan), by anonymous, but thought to be Margaret McPhun
- "There was a small woman called G" by anonymous
- "There's a strange sort of college" by Edith Aubrey Wingrove
- "Before I came to Holloway" by Madeleine Caron Rock
- "Full tide" by AA Wilson
- "Who" by Kate Evans
- "The cleaners of Holloway" by Kate Evans
- "To D.R. in Holloway" by Joan Lavender Bailie Guthrie (Laura Grey) . Thought to be about Dorothea Rock
- "Holloway, 8th March" by A Martin
- "The beech wood saunters idly to the sea" by Katherine M Richmond
- "An end" by AA Wilson
- "L'Envoi" by Emily Davison
- "Newington butts were lively" by Alice Stewart Ker

== Copies ==
- British Library
- Huntington Library
- Indiana University
- London Museum
- LSE Library
- National Library of Scotland
- New York Public Library
- Niedersächsische Staats- und Universitätsbibliothek Göttingen: SUB Göttingen
- Northwestern University
- Vassar College

Lilian Kelsall’s copy was sold at Bonhams in 2025 for £2,304.

Constance Louisa Collier’s copy was sold at Bonhams in 2022 for £2,040.

== See also ==
- Feminism in the United Kingdom
- List of suffragists and suffragettes
- List of women's rights activists
- List of women's rights organizations
- Timeline of women's suffrage
- Women's suffrage organizations
