= Joan Lavender Bailie Guthrie =

English suffragette (1889–1914)

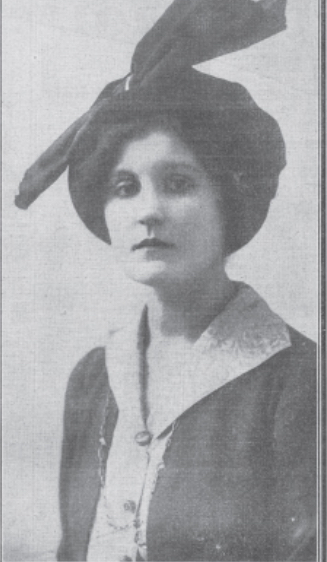
- Born: 1889; Caistor, Lincolnshire, England
- Died: 1914 (aged 24–25); Westminster, England
- Other name: Laura Grey
- Occupation: Actress
- Known for: suffrage activism

Joan Lavender Bailie Guthrie or Laura Grey (1889–1914) was a British suffragette, actress, and member of the Women's Social and Political Union (WSPU).

== Life ==
Guthrie was born in 1889 in Caistor, Lincolnshire to a middle class family.

== Suffragist ==
Guthrie joined the WSPU at the age of 18. She was arrested during Black Friday on 18 November 1910 and twice during 1911.

In 1912, she took part in a window-smashing raid, breaking the shop windows of the famous jewellers Garrard & Co of Ablemare Street, London. She was sentenced to six months imprisonment in HM Prison Holloway.

During her time in prison, she contributed to Holloway Jingles, a book of poetry which was published by the Glasgow branch of the WSPU. Her poem To D.R. is thought to be dedicated to fellow suffragette Dorothea Rock.

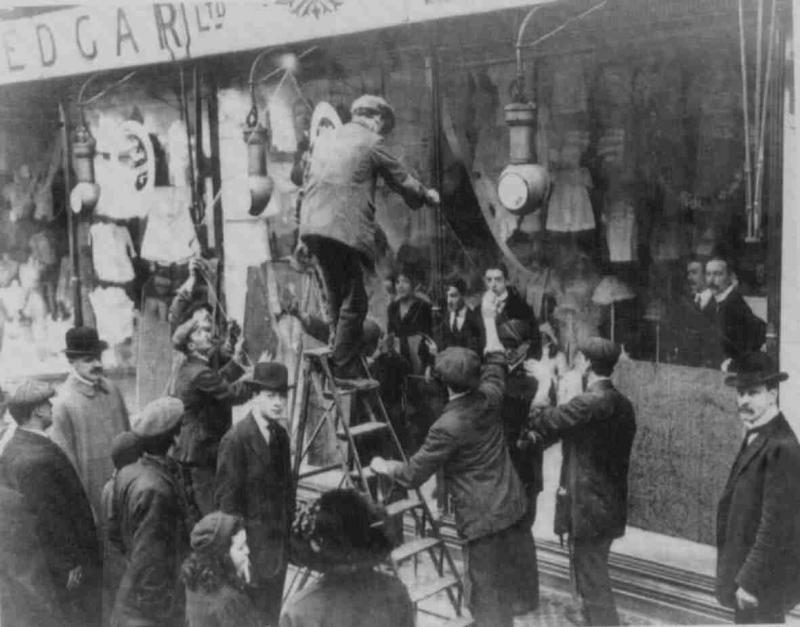
suffragette window smashing campaign

Guthrie took part in a hunger strike and was force fed. She received a hunger strike medal. It is thought that she developed an addiction to the barbiturate drug veronal, which eased the pain caused by the after effects of the force feeding. Guthrie was awarded the Hunger Strike Medal 'for Valour' by the WSPU.

Along with her suffrage campaigning, Guthrie was also an advocate for animal welfare and was a member of the Royal Society for the Protection of Birds (RSPB).

== Acting career ==
After her release from prison Guthrie worked as an actor, using the stage name Laura Grey. Her first performance was in the pantomime "The forty thieves" at the Lyceum Theatre in 1912.

== Death ==
Guthrie died at the age of 25, at 111 Jermyn Street, St James's, Westminster, leaving an estate valued at £1564. The cause of death was taking an overdose of veronal, which shocked society. A poem about her was published in the "Daily Herald" newspaper in June 1914. According to the website "Woman and her sphere", the poem was written by Anna Wickham.
