= Siege of Trieste (1813) =

- Part of the Italian campaign of 1813–1814 and the Adriatic campaign of 1807–1814
- Trieste viewed from the sea in 1813 by William Innes Pocock, a lieutenant on HMS Eagle
Date	7 September – 29 October 1813
Location	Trieste 45°39′1″N 13°46′13″E
Result	Anglo-Austrian victory

Belligerents
Austria; Britain	France; Italy

Commanders and leaders
Laval Nugent von Westmeath; Thomas Fremantle	Colonel Rabié

Strength
3 battalions infantry ½ squadron hussars	800 men 55 heavy guns

Casualties and losses
	150 killed

The siege of Trieste in September–October 1813 was an action of the War of the Sixth Coalition, part of the Napoleonic Wars. At the time, Trieste was a city in the Illyrian Provinces of the First French Empire. It was defended by the Army of Italy under the command of Eugène de Beauharnais, viceroy of the Kingdom of Italy. The city came under attack by the Austrian Empire on land and by the British Empire by sea. A state of siege was declared by the garrison commander on 7 September, but the city was not surrounded until 20 September. The main French force retreated from the area in early October, leaving only the citadel to be defended by the garrison. After fierce fighting and heavy bombardment, terms of surrender were signed on 29 October and the French marched out on 8 November.

== Background ==
In response to the Battle of Lippa on 7 September, Colonel Rabié declared a state of siege in Trieste, ordering its inhabitants to remain in the homes as far as it was possible. All citizens between the ages of 18 and 60 were conscripted into a national guard based on the city's eight districts. The guard was assigned night patrols.

On 10 September, the Austrians made an incursion into Trieste, first defeating the French at Basovizza. The French reinforced their position in the castle of San Giusto with sandbags and tactical demolitions. At 0430 hours, 150 Austrian infantry and 30 Hungarian and Croatian hussars attacked the Piazza della Borsa. They took fire from the castle and the Palazzo del Tergesteo. Two men were killed on each side. In response to this incursion, the cathedral was closed but the French occupied the bell tower until 17 September. The newspaper L'Osservatore Triestino was shut down.

In late September, Admiral Thomas Fremantle and his Royal Navy flotilla rendezvoused at Koper with General Laval Nugent von Westmeath. The navy was to blockade Trieste from the sea, while Nugent besieged it by land. Captain William Hoste and the HMS Bacchante participated in the early stage of the blockade, before being called away.

== Siege ==
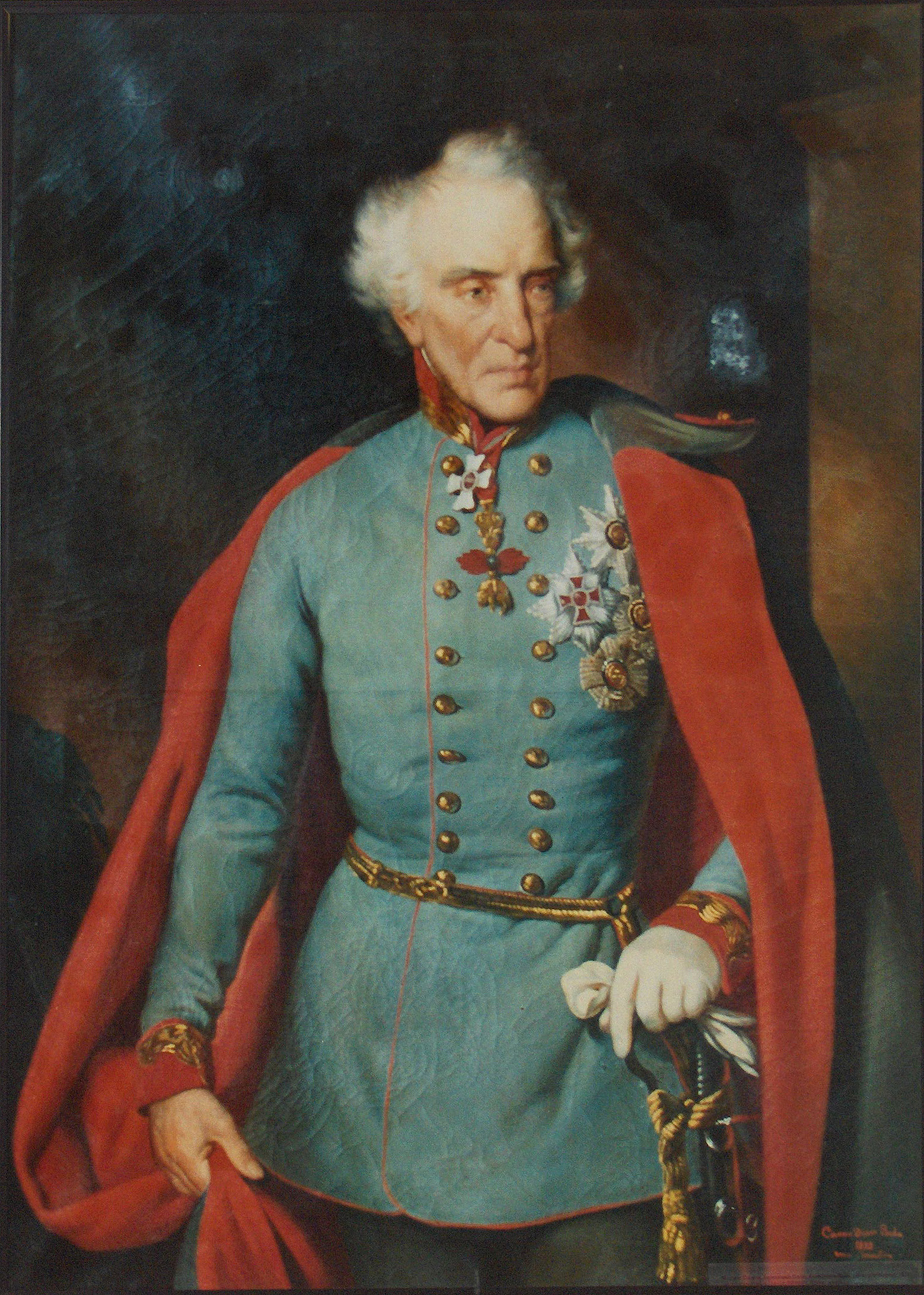
Portrait of Laval Nugent von Westmeath

On 17 September, the 3rd Italian Line Regiment of the 5th Division was ordered by General Domenico Pino to reinforce the garrison in Trieste. The French viceroy of Italy, Eugène de Beauharnais, then replaced Pino with Giuseppe Federico Palombini. On 20 September, Nugent ordered Major Gavenda to advance on Postojna and Prevalje while he himself took up a position on Monte Spaccato, thus surrounding the city. Nugent's force consisted of twelve infantry companies, half a squadron of hussars and six companies of Landwehr.

Nugent attempted to cut off Palombini's retreat on 3 October, but the latter managed to escape to Gorizia. At the same time, General Maurizio Ignazio Fresia chose to abandon Trieste. Retreating to Gorizia, he left only a garrison in the castle of San Giusto under Colonel Rabié. The siege of Trieste is sometimes said to have begun after this, on 5 October. Breaking off his pursuit of Palombini, Nugent marched on Trieste on 11 October with one battalion of infantry, one battalion of Grenzers, one battalion of Istrian Landwehr and half a squadron of Radetzky Hussars. The French garrison consisted of 800 men and 55 heavy cannons.

On 13 October, a Royal Navy flotilla consisting of the ships Elizabeth, Tremendous, Eagle, Havannah and Cerberus, the brigs Hazard, Wise and Haughty and two transports under Admiral Fremantle entered Trieste. At Servola, they disembarked 450 infantry, 20 artillerymen, four field guns and two six-pound mortars and immediately began a bombardment of the castle.

The land campaign was entrusted to General Christoph von Lattermann. On 13 October, the French reoccupied the bell tower, placing a cannon and four mortars there. On the night of 13/14 October, Lattermann sent two companies of the 52nd Infantry Battalion, five Grenzers and a platoon of hussars under his chief of staff, d'Aspre, into the Barriera Vecchia of Trieste. On 14 October, Colonel Rabié offered to surrender on terms the Austrians rejected. On 16 October, the Austrians and British launched a bombardment that lasted from 0600 to 1500 hours. The British, overshooting the castle, did much damage to the city.

There was heavy fighting on the 18 October. Some Croatian troops looted the evacuated homes along San Michele street. On 22 October, the French were compelled to abandon the bell tower by five Austrian howitzers. On 23 October, Captain Szneznitzky led an attack on the gunpowder stores called the Sanza. Aided by the British artillery under Captain Rowby, he took a French captain and 46 men prisoner for the loss of 17 killed and 46 wounded. The attackers kept up a constant bombardment through the night of 24/25 October in order to prevent the French from recovering the Sanza.

== Aftermath ==
On 25 October, Colonel Rabié proposed new terms of surrender, which were accepted in principle. Final terms were agreed on 29 October. They were signed by Rabié, Fremantle and Nugent. A Mass was celebrated in the Church of Santa Maria Maggiore on 31 October and in the damaged cathedral on 2 November. On 3 November, the handover of the castle was set for 1000 hours on 8 November. The French marched out with the honours of war, led by Major Lazzarich. They were disarmed and escorted to the advance posts of the Army of Italy. There were 641 men who left behind 182 cannons of all types. The French had suffered 150 killed. The Austrians put Trieste under the command of Count Joseph L'Espine. The British fleet transported Nugent and his troops from Trieste to the delta of the Po to continue the war in Italy.

== Works cited ==
- Hardy, Malcolm Scott (2005). The British Navy, Rijeka and A. L. Adamic: War and Trade in the Adriatic 1800–25. Archaeopress.
- Hardy, Malcolm Scott (2024). The British in the Adriatic, 1800–1825. Archaeopress.
- Knežević, Saša; Vukićević, Boris (2020). "Montenegrin–British Military Cooperation Against the French in the Bay of Kotor (1813–1814)". War in History. 28 (4): 781–796. doi:10.1177/0968344520904065.
- Mattei, Aldo (1940). "La campagna tra Francesi e Austriaci nella Venezia Giulia ed a Trieste nel 1813". Porta Orientale. 11 (1–3): 29–53.
- Nafziger, George F.; Gioannini, Marco (2002). The Defense of the Napoleonic Kingdom of Northern Italy, 1813–1814. Praeger.
