= Government Actuary's Department =

United Kingdom government non-ministerial department

Government Actuary's Department Welsh: Adran Actiwari'r Llywodraeth

Non-ministerial government department overview
- Formed: 1919
- Jurisdiction: United Kingdom
- Headquarters: 10 South Colonnade, Canary Wharf, London
- Employees: 224 (average, 2024–25)
- Non-ministerial government department executive: Fiona Dunsire, Government Actuary
- Website: www.gov.uk/gad

The Government Actuary's Department (GAD) is a non-ministerial department in the UK Civil Service that provides actuarial advice and analysis for the UK government and other public sector bodies.

Established in 1919, it works with government departments, devolved administrations and local authorities on long-term financial risks and policy issues. The department is headed by the Government Actuary.

== History ==
In 1912 the government appointed a chief actuary to the National Health Insurance Joint Committee, following the Old Age Pensions Act 1908 and the National Insurance Act 1911. As the role of the Chief Actuary expanded, the post of Government Actuary was created in 1917. The Government Actuary's Department was formed two years later.

The role of GAD within government expanded significantly in the 1940s and 1950s, coinciding with an expansion of the state's role in pensions, social security and health care.

By the 1980s GAD had grown into a significant actuarial consultancy within government and in 1989 the financing of GAD through an annual parliamentary vote of funds was replaced by a system of directly charging users of GAD's services. The calculation of GAD's fees is based solely on the recovery of its costs.

== Role and functions ==
The Government Actuary's Department provides actuarial analysis, modelling and advice to the UK public sector, including government departments, devolved administrations and other public bodies. The framework document agreed between HM Treasury and the department states that most of its roles are commissioned by clients, alongside a limited number of duties set out in statute.

A substantial part of its work relates to pensions, including technical advice and actuarial analysis for pensions policy development and for public service pension schemes. In its 2024–25 annual report, the department reported that this included work for officials in HM Treasury and the Department for Work and Pensions, and support for bodies such as the Pension Protection Fund and The Pensions Regulator.

The department undertakes work on insurance, investment and wider long-term financial risks, including quality assurance and review of models used to assess liabilities, costs and risk exposures.

== Organisation and governance ==
GAD is a non-ministerial department within the UK civil service. A framework document agreed with HM Treasury sets out the department's governance, accountability and financial arrangements.

The framework document identifies the Government Actuary as the head of department and its Accounting Officer, with responsibilities including stewardship of public resources and maintaining effective governance and risk management arrangements. In its 2024–25 annual report, GAD reported that its funding is budgeted to be met entirely from fees charged to its clients.

In 2024–25 the department reported its headquarters as 10 South Colonnade in Canary Wharf, London, and an average of 224 employees. As of 2025 the Government Actuary was Fiona Dunsire.

== Government Actuary ==
The Government Actuary is the principal actuarial adviser to the UK government and leads the Government Actuary's Department, acting as its Accounting Officer.

The department's annual report notes statutory responsibilities connected with social security, including regular reports to the UK Parliament on the financial position of the National Insurance Fund as required by legislation. These include an annual report on the expected impact of benefit up-rating or changes in contributions, and a report every five years setting out longer-term projections for the fund. The annual report notes a statutory role for the Government Actuary in reporting in connection with reviews of the State Pension age.

== List of Government Actuaries ==
The Government Actuary is the permanent head of the Government Actuary's Department.

Government Actuary	Took office	Left office
Sir Alfred Watson	14 May 1917	7 May 1936
Sir George Epps	19 May 1936	30 November 1944
Sir Percy Harvey	1 December 1944	30 August 1946
Sir George Maddex	31 August 1946	1 April 1958
Sir Herbert Tetley	1 April 1958	30 April 1973
Sir Edward Johnston	1 May 1973	14 April 1989
Christopher Daykin	15 April 1989	30 September 2007
Trevor Llanwarne	1 May 2008	1 August 2014
Martin Clarke	1 August 2014	1 November 2023
Fiona Dunsire	1 November 2023	Incumbent

Andrew Johnston served as acting Government Actuary during April 2008.

=== Timeline of government actuaries ===
Alfred Watson
George Epps
Percy Harvey
George Maddex
Herbert Tetley
Edward Johnston
Christopher Daykin
Trevor Llanwarne
Martin Clarke
Fiona Dunsire
│
1900
│
1910
│
1920
│
1930
│
1940
│
1950
│
1960
│
1970
│
1980
│
1990
│
2000
│
2010
│
2020
Former Incumbent
