= Alfred Watson (actuary) =

British actuary and civil servant

Sir Alfred Watson KCB FIA

Government Actuary
- In office 14 May 1917 – 7 May 1936
- Preceded by: Office established
- Succeeded by: George Epps

Personal details
- Born: 11 March 1870 Bristol, England
- Died: 7 May 1936 (aged 66) London, England

Sir Alfred William Watson KCB FIA (11 March 1870 – 7 May 1936) was a British actuary and civil servant. In 1917 he became Britain's first government actuary and was very influential in setting up funding from National Insurance for the newly introduced state pension.

== Early life ==
Watson was born in Bristol on 11 March 1870 to parents Alfred Reuban Watson, a violinist and composer, and Emily Morris Hobro. He studied at Nottingham High School, before joining his grandfather Reuban Watson's actuarial practice, R. Watson and Sons. He became a fellow of the Institute of Actuaries in 1893, passing his final examination with the highest mark in his year.

== Career ==
In 1896, Watson was appointed to the 1896 Rothschild Committee on Old Age Pensions, which had been set up to investigate establishing a state pension in the United Kingdom, following the introduction of a state pension in Germany. The committee concluded in 1898 that none of the systems presented to them were viable. Watson questioned witnesses with an "aggressive and combative style".

After continuing his career as an actuary, consulting for friendly societies including the Manchester Unity of Oddfellows. In 1903, he published an article titled Sickness and Mortality Experience (1893–97) of the Manchester Unity of Oddfellows in the Journal of the Institute of Actuaries. In the article, he demonstrated an increase in sickness and a reduction in mortality, with links between occupation and sickness and between region and mortality, and that sickness benefit claims had risen for all groups of members, but most significantly for members older than 65. He began consulting in London from 1910. He gave a series of lectures on the subject of Friendly society finance to the Institute of Actuaries in 1911 and 1912.

Watson gave advice about the writing of the National Insurance Act 1911, before being appointed chief actuary to the National Health Insurance Joint Committee after the National Insurance bill had become law in 1912. In this role, which he held until 1919, he advised various government departments during World War I. During this time, he worked on plans with the Ministry of Shipping to optimise the use of shipping.

== Government actuary ==
Watson became the first government actuary on 14 May 1917, gaining influence with the expansion of National Insurance, particularly with regard to pensions. He worked inside HM Treasury, and was seen to be aligned with the department's desire for more control over social policy. The Government Actuary's Department was created in July 1919. During the time he held the role, no social policy could become law without his approval. He was often consulted by all government departments on subjects, including subjects outside his specialism.

Watson served on royal commissions on decimalisation in 1918 and national health insurance in 1926. He served as president of the Institute of Actuaries from 1920 to 1922 and served on the council of the Royal Statistical Society and the committee of the Reform Club.

Watson has been credited as the "driving force" behind the introduction of contributory pensions in the United Kingdom, believing that means-tested pensions or universal pensions paid for by general taxation would be unsustainable.

== Personal life ==
Watson married Elizabeth Moffrey, daughter of a grand master of the Manchester Unity of Oddfellows, in June 1895. They had two daughters and a son, who died in childhood. Watson died on 7 May 1936 in London, while still in his role as the government actuary.

== Honours ==
Watson was knighted in 1915 and made a knight commander of the order of the Bath (KCB) in 1920.
