= H. R. S. Pocock =

British author

Hugh Raymond Spilsbury Pocock (18 September 1904–1988) was a British writer.

== Biography ==
Pocock was born in Kent, England, the son of Olive née Raymond (1882–1965) and accountant Bernard George Pocock (1875–1954). He won a scholarship to St Paul's School before accepting a scholarship in Greats (the classics in Latin and Ancient Greek) at Pembroke College, Oxford. From there he went on to join Royal Dutch Shell where he worked until his retirement. After moving to Chile as general manager, where he met his wife, Agnes Sydney Margaret Pocock (known as Peggy) he moved on to head the office at Rio de Janeiro, before returning to London as secretary to the board of directors. He retired to Jersey in 1959. Ray and Peggy had three children: Ann, Jenny and Mark. Ann married Hugh Hedley Scurfield on 11 Jul 1959 in Reigate, Surrey.

== Writing ==
Pocock published The Conquest of Chile and The Memoirs of Lord Coutanche about the wartime Bailiff of Jersey, as well as a book of poetry, Farmyard Comedian and other Poems. He also left to the island detailed research on its Martello towers. A keen amateur astronomer, his interests brought him the acquaintance of Sir Patrick Moore. He was also a talented composer, and left behind the full piano score to a musical of one of Oscar Wilde's plays, Lady Windermere's Fan, much in the style of Gilbert and Sullivan.

== Ancestors ==
H. R. S. Pocock was a great-grandson of William Willmer Pocock, Master of the Worshipful Company of Carpenters, who was responsible for the design of Carpenters' Hall.
