= Rodney Joseph Burn =

British artist (1899–1984)

- Born: 11 July 1899; Palmers Green, London, England
- Died: 11 August 1984 (aged 85)
- Education: Slade School of Fine Art
- Known for: Landscape & portrait painting

Rodney Joseph Burn RA (11 July 1899 – 11 August 1984) was a British artist who painted landscapes, portraits and figures and seascapes. During his long career he also worked in America and painted in the Channel Islands and Venice and was elected a member of the Royal Academy in 1962.

== Life and work ==
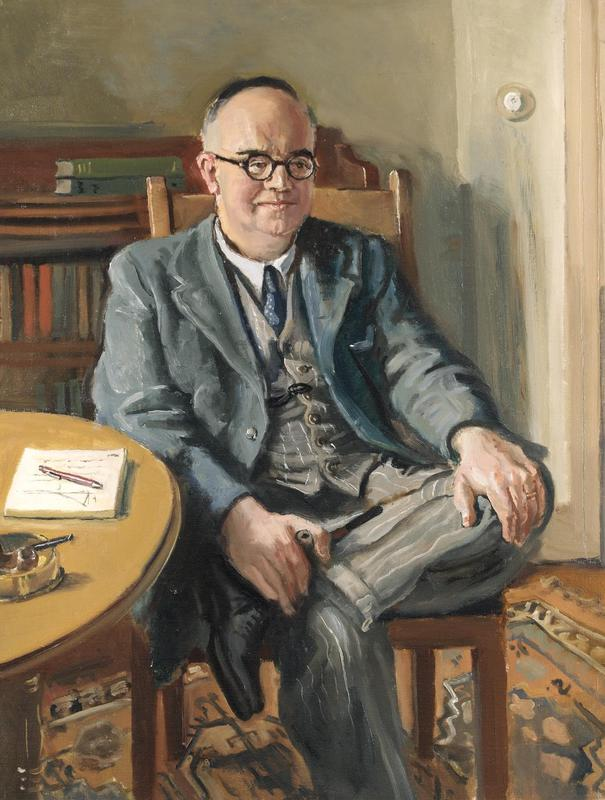
Dr R E Stradling, CB, MD, FRS (1945) (Art.IWM ART LD 3559)

Burn was born in Palmers Green in London and attended Harrow School. His father was Sir Joseph Burn, who was the chairman of the Prudential Insurance company.

After military service in the British army in World War One, Burn entered the Slade School of Art where he studied between 1918 and 1922. At the Slade Burn won six major prizes, featured in an article in The Burlington Magazine and met his future wife, the sculptor Dorothy Sharwood Smith. Burn was among a number of London artschool graduates selected by the London County Council to produce a large work for a series showing scenes from London parks, that was intended for the newly built County Hall. Burn exhibited with the New English Art Club from 1923 and held a joint exhibition, with Stephen Bone and Robin Guthrie, at the Goupil Gallery in 1926. From 1929 to 1931 he taught as a tutor at the Royal College of Art. From 1931 to 1934 he was, with Robin Guthrie, the joint director of painting and drawing at the School of the Museum of Fine Arts, Boston.

During the Second World War, Burn was among the artists who worked at the Civil Defence Camouflage Establishment based in Leamington Spa. Later during the war he completed a number of short commissions for the War Artists' Advisory Committee, including a portrait of Dr Stradling, a Director of the Camouflage Establishment. After the war Burn returned to the Royal College of Art and taught there as a Senior Tutor until his retirement in 1965. During his career he also taught at both the Camberwell School of Art and at the City and Guilds of London Art School. Dorothy Sharwood Smith also taught at Camberwell for several years. Burn spent his later years teaching in Europe and sailing. For a time he lived on the south coast of England near Chichester and his last studio was on the bank of the Thames at Chiswick.

== Memberships ==
Burn was a member of or affiliated with the following organisations:

- 1924: Member, later Honorary Secretary, of the New English Art Club,
- 1954: Elected associate of the Royal Academy,
- 1962: Elected full member of the Royal Academy.

Burn was also a member of the Royal West of England Academy and President of the St. Ives Society of Artists
