= Hugh Hedley Scurfield =

English actuary (1935–2020)

Hugh Scurfield
- Born: 9 December 1935
- Died: 1 December 2020 (aged 84)

Hugh Scurfield was an English actuary of considerable note. He was born on 9 December 1935 in the County of Durham, England; the third of four children to William Russell Scurfield and Elizabeth Morton Scurfield (née Hedley). He graduated from Hertford College, Oxford with an M.A. in 1956. Hugh died on 1 December 2020.

Scurfield was the past president of Institute of Actuaries (1990 - 1992), and past president of the International Congress of Actuaries (1998). Scurfield was the General Manager, Actuary, and Director of Norwich Union Insurance Group, now known as Aviva. Other notable positions held by Scurfield include: Director, Ecclesiastical Insurance Group (1994 - 2004); Member, International Actuarial Association (1998); Non-executive Director, Royal Shrewsbury Hospital NHS Trust (2003); Deputy Chairman, Help the Hospice (2002 -2006); appointed Vice President, Help The Hospice (May 2006); Trustee and Chairman of the Lottery for Severn Hospice.

In 1959 Scurfield won the coxless pair "Goblets" event at Henley Royal Regatta with Richard Norton. They represented Great Britain in the European Rowing Championships that year and came 4th. In 1966 he led a Norwich Union RC crew to victory in the coxless four Wyfold Challenge Cup.

In 2008, Scurfield was appointed Chairman of The Development Trust (The King's School Worcester).

Hugh is a member of the Scurfield family. https://en.m.wikipedia.org/wiki/Scurfield#

Hugh married Ann Beverley Pocock, daughter of H R S Pocock, 11 Jul 1959 in Reigate, Surrey. He married Jill Charles-Edwards, daughter of Mervyn Charles-Edwards, 08 Dec 1978 in Bishops Castle following his divorce from Ann in 1977. The four children of Hugh and Ann are: Bryan Hugh Scurfield, b. 10 May 1960, Norwich; Jane Elizabeth Scurfield, b. 31 Aug 1962, Norwich; Mary Sara Scurfield, b. 22 May 1964, Norwich; and Clare Louise Scurfield, b. 19 Aug 1967, Norwich.

== Published papers ==
- Address by the President of the Institute of Actuaries: Developing a Proactive Role, 25 June 1990. J.I.A. 118, 1-15 (1991)
- Lessons from Hospices: Past-president Hugh Scurfield develops a topic raised at the ageing population’s conference earlier in 2002

== See also ==
- Institute of Actuaries
