= Wendell Milliman =

American business executive (1905–1976)

Wendell Milliman (1905–1976) was a founder of Milliman, Inc., formerly Milliman & Robertson, one of the largest actuarial and business consulting firms in the world. Starting as the Pacific Northwest's only independent consulting actuary in a small two-room Seattle office in 1947, Milliman co-founded, with Stuart Robertson, a company that grew to encompass offices across the nation, first on the West Coast, then in Milwaukee, and then in more than 30 locations throughout the country. It also has offices in 16 countries across the globe. Based on a profit-sharing model that brings together independent consultants under a common corporate banner, Milliman, Inc. looked for and found new opportunities to provide actuarial services to insurers and pension planners as the United States dramatically changed and its economy grew during the post-World War II years.

== Early life and career ==
Wendell Milliman was born December 13, 1905, in Seattle. He grew up in the family home on 15th Avenue NE, north of the University of Washington (UW). He attended Lincoln High School and then entered the UW, receiving his degree in mathematics in 1926. It was while attending the UW that he met his future wife, Dorothy Pierce, who was studying library science. He married Dorothy soon after he obtained a job as a clerk in the actuarial department of Oregon Mutual Life Insurance Company (later Standard Insurance Company), in Portland, Oregon.

After two years in Portland, Milliman returned to Seattle for a job with Northwestern Mutual Accident Association, a predecessor of Northwestern Life Insurance Company. In 1929, he went to work for the Seattle Employees' Retirement System, helping develop the city's new retirement plan. He quickly decided that employment with a large Eastern firm would help his career and accepted a position in the actuarial department of New York City-based Equitable Life Assurance Society. He worked there for 18 years, during which time he achieved fellowship status in the Actuarial Society (1934) and rose to the rank of vice president in the firm (1945).

== The birth of an independent actuarial consulting firm ==
He wanted to return to Washington and, although there was no single insurance firm of sufficient size in the region, he saw the opportunity to act as a consultant to a number of small firms. After conferring with business associates, he became encouraged that this model could enable him to return home. Long-time Washington state insurance commissioner William A. Sullivan soon offered him a retainer to serve his department in assisting a number of small, local life insurance companies that needed actuarial help. He also went to work on behalf of the Washington State Employees Retirement System in developing a retirement plan for employees. That, combined with consulting work for Eastern companies, was enough to launch the Milliman office in Seattle, which opened at 914 Second Avenue near the end of 1947. At this time he had a wife, Dorothy, and four children.

A little over two years later, he hired Stuart A. Robertson, who had been working as an actuary for Northwestern Life Insurance Company. He joined the Milliman firm on April 1, 1950.

== Early partnership ==
Six months later, Milliman received an offer from New York Life Insurance Company to become a vice president in charge of organizing and administrating the firm's group insurance department at a salary of $25,000 per year, which he accepted.

He arranged to sell the firm to Robertson over the next five years and moved to New York again. However, when he had effectively organized the group practice, he looked once again to Seattle. In 1955, almost exactly five years after selling the firm, he proposed re-establishing the partnership to Robertson and a three-way partnership, including the recently hired Tom Bleakney, was formed.

== The firm's first growth spurt ==
The renewed partnership of Milliman and Robertson confronted new opportunities as post-war prosperity continued to surge in the late 1950s. This in turn brought about growth in insurance and new concerns for financial security. Soon, Milliman & Robertson would open an office in San Francisco and begin to take on new principals, who would all be given equal shares in the company. It was the decision by Milliman and Robertson to share profits among the partners that set the stage for further expansion and innovation in coming years.

== A boom in actuarial consulting ==
In the early 1960s, medical technology advanced rapidly, bringing about a simultaneous rise in medical costs. Concern about covering these costs spurred the development of many kinds of healthcare plans. At the same time, new life and casualty companies sprang up, as labor organizations negotiated health benefits and pension plans. Actuaries were needed to work out the longevity probabilities and incidence of specific illnesses, and provide information and services to the growing insurance industry.

With expansion came the need to specialize. The consultants at Milliman, encouraged to innovate, gradually branched off into different specialties, such as health insurance or pensions, giving the firm further reach. On April 1, 1961, the firm opened its first non-West-Coast office, in Milwaukee, headed up by Bill Halvorson. This was an important step toward Milliman's dream of having a truly national scope.

Over the years, Milliman and his associates built on the firm's fundamentals. The model was highly entrepreneurial, giving principals the opportunity to invest in new expansion, either geographically or into new practice areas, and enabling them to benefit from successes while taking on some of the risks.

Wendell Milliman retired from the firm in 1971, replaced by Robertson as chairman and chief executive officer. He died on January 31, 1976, at the age of 70.

In addition to co-founding Milliman, Inc., Wendell Milliman played a significant role in a number of professional organizations, including the American Academy of Actuaries, which he helped form, and the Society of Actuaries, where he served as president in 1969.
