= Christopher Daykin =

British actuary and civil servant (born 1948)

Christopher David Daykin CB (born 18 July 1948) is a British actuary and civil servant. He was the head of the United Kingdom Government Actuary’s Department (GAD) from 1989 to 2007 where he worked on social security, pension fund consultancy, national pension policy, population projections, risk management and pension reform. He is the second-longest holder of the post.

After graduating from Cambridge University with an honours degree in mathematics in 1970, Daykin qualified as a Fellow of the Institute of Actuaries in 1973 where he served as President between 1994 and 1996. He was also a President of the International Forum of Actuarial Associations in 1996–97 and was awarded the Medallist award from the International Actuarial Association in 2014.

In 1993 New Year Honours, he was appointed a Companion of the Order of the Bath (CB).

In 1995, he was presented with an Honorary Doctor of Science from City University of London.

Daykin was awarded the Gold Medal of the Institute of Actuaries in 1998 and the Medal of Merit of the International Social Security Association in 2007.

Daykin has published reports on issues such as the state pension scheme and co-authored the book Practical Risk Theory for Actuaries.

== Early life ==
He has a first class mathematics degree from Pembroke College, Cambridge University and attended Merchant Taylors' School, London.

== See also ==
- Government Actuary's Department
- Institute of Actuaries
