= Stuart A. Robertson =

Stuart A. Robertson (1918–2005) was co-founder, with Wendell Milliman, of Milliman, Inc., formerly Milliman & Robertson, which would grow to become one of the largest actuarial and business consulting firms in the world, encompassing more than 30 locations throughout the United States with offices in 16 other countries. Robertson, who attended the University of Washington before becoming an actuary, joined Milliman in the first consulting actuarial practice in the Pacific Northwest in 1950. Following Milliman's retirement in 1971, Robertson was CEO and chairman until his retirement in 1983.

== Early life and career ==
Stuart Robertson was born on February 28, 1918, in Montesano, Wash., in Gray's Harbor County about 95 miles southwest of Seattle. The family was shaken when the father, a civil engineer, died just three months after Stuart's birth. Eventually, because of their mother's efforts and working outside of school, all five children went to college.

In 1934, Robertson at first entered the University of Idaho in Moscow, Idaho, because of the low tuition. But when he was told he must pay a higher out-of-state rate, he transferred to the University of Washington where he helped meet the costs of board and tuition by working part-time as a houseboy in a campus sorority and with a second job at the federally funded National Youth Administration. During summer breaks, he worked at a pea cannery, earning 37 cents an hour.

In his junior year at college, Robertson was reconsidering his future course when he saw a recruiting notice for actuaries on a bulletin board in the math department. After some research to find what an actuary actually did, he became intrigued. Milliman principal Stan Roberts once described actuaries as “doctors of probability,” in that their occupation involves calculating the likelihood of such things as how long an individual will live after retirement or how likely someone is to come down with a specific disease. These calculations are used by companies like insurance firms and financial institutions to calculate rates and decide what services to provide.

From his research, Robertson learned that he could earn the status of Fellow in the Actuarial Institute by passing tests and decided this might better serve his goal than a bachelor's degree. A day after his 19th birthday, he began a job as a clerk for the actuary at the Great Northwest Life Insurance Company in Spokane, Wash. He also began studying for his first actuarial exam.

From 1937 to 1947, he rose through the ranks at Great Northwest to become a vice president in the firm. He dealt with multiple aspects of insurance, including actuarial work, accounting, underwriting, and stockholder and policyholder relations. In 1939, he married childhood acquaintance Marjory Moch, whom he'd been dating since high school. In 1947, he accepted his first actuary-only position at Northwestern Life and returned to Seattle.

At this point, anticipating his final actuarial exam, he began to consider a move to the East Coast to expand his prospects. But then he met Wendell Milliman, who made the case for the potential of actuarial consulting. Milliman had established the first consulting actuarial practice in the Pacific Northwest in 1947. He worked for state government and firms that were too small to have their own actuarial departments.

== Partnership with Milliman ==
Robertson joined Milliman in his two-room office at 914 Second Avenue in Seattle, bringing Northwestern Life along as a client. In one room, the two shared a phone and an enormous desk, with a top consisting of a five-foot-by-five-foot oak slab. The desk had “a full complement of drawers on either side,” Robertson later recalled. Milliman and Robertson were so busy that they “spent little time conversing other than to say ‘pass the telephone.’"

In addition to Northwestern Life, Robertson, who by this time had experience working for small insurance firms, was assigned to work for eight or nine such clients. However, just six months after coming to work with Milliman, Robertson found himself in a novel situation. Wendell Milliman had been offered a job with a large Eastern firm, New York Life Insurance Company, to become a vice president in charge of organizing and administrating the firm's new group insurance department. While the pay—$25,000 per year—was good for 1950, it was the challenge that attracted him and he decided to go.

Milliman offered to sell Robertson the firm and, though Robertson had concerns that he had no backup capital of his own, he finally accepted. The terms included $1,000 up front and five yearly payments, which eventually amounted to $9,630. Five years later, however, Milliman made a surprise visit to Robertson, at which point he asked if he would like a partner—namely one Wendell Milliman.

Robertson readily agreed and soon they formed Milliman & Robertson; they were joined by new partner Tom Bleakney, whom Robertson had hired in Milliman's absence. In 1957, the firm incorporated. By 1965, it had opened new offices in Los Angeles; Portland, Ore.;Honolulu; Salt Lake City; Chicago; and New York City. At that point, Milliman & Robertson was the second largest actuarial firm in the country.

== Evolution of the firm ==
Over the years, Milliman and Robertson built on the firm's fundamentals. An entrepreneurial model gave principals the opportunity to invest in new expansion, either geographically or into new practice areas, and enabled them to benefit from successes while taking on some of the risks.

When Milliman retired in 1971, Robertson was named CEO and chairman of the firm. James Curtis became president. At the time, Robertson had been in the actuarial field for 30 years. In 1974, under his leadership, a peer-review process was adopted to check on the quality of work in real time. In 1976, the firm reorganized so that four national directors oversaw four practice areas.

Colleagues praised Robertson for his contribution to the firm's professionalism and for a slight streak of conservatism that kept the firm on course. He also proved his skill as a writer when, in 1988, he published his book, Milliman and Robertson: Reflections on the First Forty Years.

== Personal life ==
Robertson had a home on Bainbridge Island, Washington. He died on November 4, 2005, at the age of 87. He was survived by his wife Marjory, his son, and three grandchildren, David, Richard, and Thomas. As a tribute to Robertson soon after his death, Milliman, Inc. announced the Stuart Robertson Scholarship Fund, to be used to help undergraduates who demonstrate talent in the actuarial field.
