= Barclay Barrowman =

Dr Barclay Barrowman JP, DTM, FCO, FRSH was a British medical doctor who conducted early research on malaria. Barrowman also served as the personal physician to the Sultan of Selangor.

== Early life ==
Barrowman was born on 10 March 1896 in the Kelvin area of Glasgow, Scotland. He was the youngest child of John Barrowman (1844–1900), a lime merchant and Helen Agnew (1854-?). His sister was the Scottish suffragette, Janet Barrowman.

Barrowman attended Hillhead High School, and studied at Glasgow University. After graduating from the university, Barrowman joined the Royal Naval Volunteer Reserve, serving in World War I as a surgeon. He served in West Africa, Ireland, India, China and Japan. After the war, he returned home to Glasgow, where he worked as a general practitioner.

In 1928 Barrowman married Marguerite Emily Burn (born 18 January 1901), the daughter of Sir Joseph Burn and wife Lady Emily H Burn.

== Service in Malaya ==
After earning a Diploma of Tropical Medicine and Tropical Hygiene from the University of Liverpool, Barrowman moved to British Malaya in 1923. After working for several years in Sir Malcolm Watson's estate practice at Klang, Barrowman took over the practice in 1928.

In 1930, Barrowman was appointed Personal Physician to the Sultan of Selangor, who gave him the title "Dato' Semboh Di Raja of Selangor, Malaya" in 1937. Working as a malariologist, Barrowman made advances in the treatment and prevention of malaria, writing several articles on the subject. He ran instructional courses on malaria control on behalf of the League of Nations for public health officers from the Far East and Australia. He also worked to improve the housing condition and social welfare of the local labour force. Barrowman served as President of the BMA Malayan Branch and was appointed a Justice of the Peace by the Sultan's successor.

When the Japanese invaded Malaya during World War II, Barrowman was on leave in Australia. He served in the Royal Army, achieving he rank of Colonel. He advised the Australian Military Forces, then the Malayan Planning Unit of the War Office in London. At the end of the war, Barrowman returned to Malaya as a Lieutenant-Colonel, serving with the Military Administration as Advisor in Malariology.

== Later years ==
In 1947, Barrowman retired after suffering for a few years of a progressive illness. The local communities in Klang petitioned for a new highway to Port Swettenham, Malaya to be named Barrowman Road after his retirement.

Barrowman died on 31 January 1978 in Elstree and Potters Bar Registration District leaving a Will which was probated on 19 April 1978 in Winchester.

== Personal ==
Barclay and Marguerite had two children: Gillian Emily Barrowman who was born around 1931 in Malaya and Gavin Renfrew Barrowman who was born 1933 in Kuala Lumpur.

Mrs Marguerite Barrowman published Life As Remembered From Rydal Mount (1905–1927) which has been published by The Potters Bar and District Historical Society.

Barrowman was interviewed, in March 1976, by the historian, Brian Harrison, as part of the Suffrage Interviews project, titled Oral evidence on the suffragette and suffragist movements: the Brian Harrison interviews. The interview provides details of the Barrowman family, and discussion of the siblings.
