= Milliman =

International actuarial and consulting firm

Milliman Inc.
- Type: Actuarial, Consulting
- Industry: Actuarial; Management consulting Insurance; Human Resources; Professional Services; Employee Benefits
- Founded: 1947; 79 years ago
- Headquarters: Seattle, Washington, U.S.
- Key people: Dermot Corry, President and CEO; Ken Mungan (Actuary), Chairman
- Products: Professional Services; Consulting
- Website: www.milliman.com

Milliman, formerly Milliman & Robertson, is an international actuarial and consulting firm based in Seattle, Washington.

The company was founded in 1947, by Wendell Milliman and Stuart A. Robertson and operates 59 offices internationally, with over 3,000 employees. Milliman is owned and managed by approximately 350 principals. The firm's primary business includes consulting practices in employee benefits, healthcare, investment, life insurance and financial services, and property and casualty insurance. The firm also provides data analysis and predictive analytics.

== History ==
In the late 1940s, actuary Wendell Milliman started a consultancy in the Pacific Northwest. He was later joined by Stuart A. Robertson to establish Milliman & Robertson, Inc. The firm was initially centered mainly on assessing business risk and pension issues. In the retirement plan industry, Milliman provided services in actuarial consulting, consulting on compensation and care, retirement outsourcing, and others.

During the 1950s, Milliman & Robertson established the first health insurance benchmarking tool for the US healthcare market. During this time the company began expanding to other states and began offering other services, such as new forms of annuities, and employee benefit plans and pensions. The company's first international office was opened in Tokyo during the 1990s, which was followed by international offices in several other foreign markets, and the first foreign insurance consulting assignment to be given in the People's Republic of China.

== Milliman indices ==
Milliman produces economic indexes for the American healthcare and insurance markets, including the Milliman 100 Pension Funding index. The Pension Funding Index examines the liabilities and assets of the top 100 pension funds in the US, establishing the funded status of the group overall. The company also releases an annual Milliman Medical Index, first published in 2001. The Medical Index calculates the total annual cost of healthcare for an American family of four covered by employer healthcare coverage. Between 2002 and 2015, it has shown an increase of 267% in healthcare costs to these family units.

=== Milliman care guidelines ===
Milliman Inc. previously owned MCG (formerly known as Milliman Care Guidelines and now known as MCG Health), which has been producing evidence-based clinical guidelines for healthcare organizations since 1990. In 2012, the Hearst Corporation acquired MCG.
