= Frances McPhun =

Scottish suffragette (1880–1940)

Frances Mary McPhun
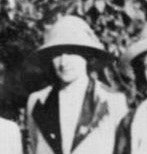
- from group shot below
- Born: 1880; Glasgow, Scotland
- Died: 1940 (aged 59–60); Glasgow, Scotland
- Education: University of Glasgow
- Known for: Scottish suffragette
- Parent(s): John McPhun; Fanny McPhun
- Relatives: Margaret McPhun (sister)

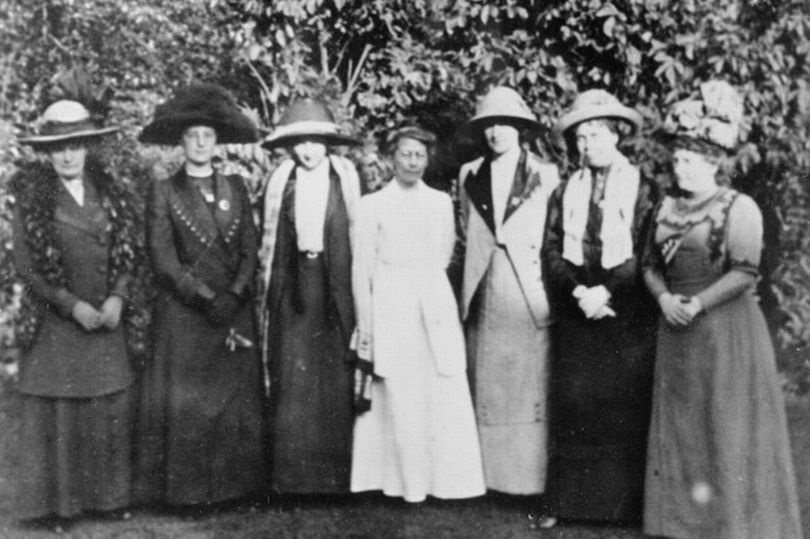
Helen Crawfurd, Janet Barrowman, Margaret McPhun, Mrs A.A. Wilson, Frances McPhun, Nancy A. John and Annie Swan

Frances Mary McPhun (1880–1940) was a Scottish suffragette who served two months in Holloway prison, and had organised events and processions for women's suffrage in Edinburgh.

== Life ==
Frances Mary McPhun was born in Glasgow in 1880. She studied at the University of Glasgow, graduating with an MA degree, and winning prizes in Political Economy, Moral Philosophy and English Literature. She and her sister Margaret McPhun joined the Women's Social and Political Union (WSPU). She arranged a pageant of famous Scottish women for a women's suffrage procession in Edinburgh in October 1909. She was honorary organising secretary for the Scottish Suffrage Exhibition in 1910, and was honorary secretary of the Glasgow branch of the WSPU in 1911-1912. She and her sister were amongst dozens jailed for smashing government office windows in March, 1912. She served two months hard labour in Holloway. The sisters used the name "Campbell" to hide their background when they were arrested. When they were released from Holloway Prison after two months they were given Hunger Strike Medals 'for Valour' by the WSPU to record their hunger strikes, although the sisters had agreed that they would choose to drink from a cup to avoid being force fed through a nasal tube. She was very active in by-election campaigns in the west of Scotland. Frances McPhun died in 1940 in Glasgow.

The younger sister of Frances and Margaret McPhun was Nessie McPhun, who married a Glasgow businessman called Andrew R Findlay. A grandson of Andrew and Nessie Findlay is Scottish Conservative MSP Russell Findlay, who made reference to the sisters in a speech to the Scottish Parliament in March 2022.

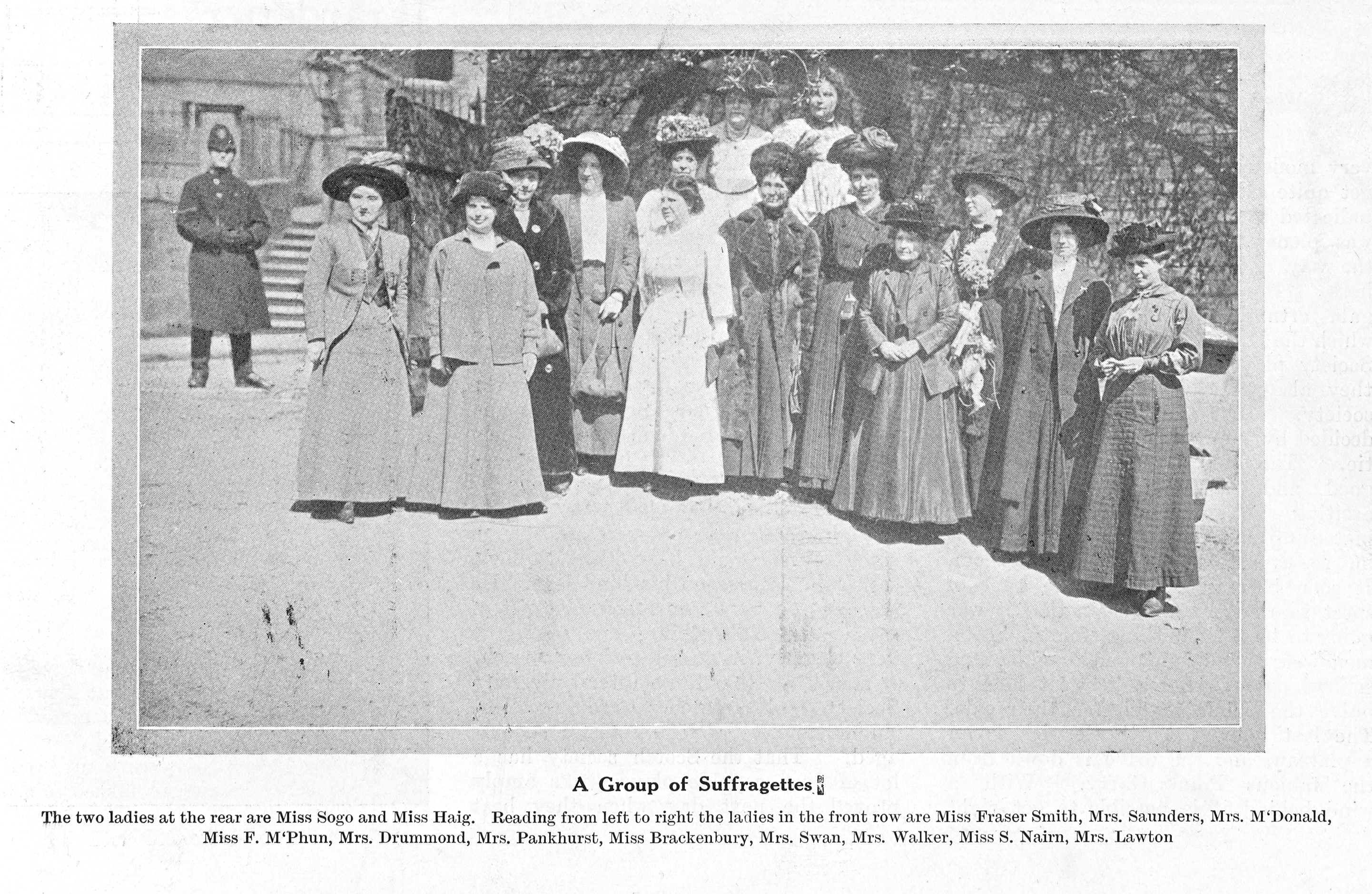
Group photograph of Suffragettes at Bazaar in Glasgow in 1910

== Further Information ==
In March 2000, female members of the University of Glasgow's Student Representative Council temporarily renamed the Adam Smith building after McPhun for International Women's Day.
