= John Finlaison =

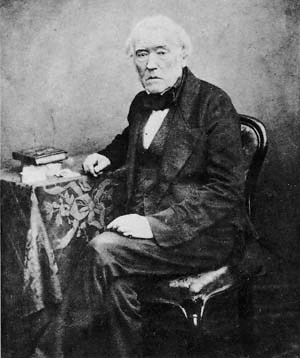
John Finlaison, by unknown photographer

John Finlaison (1783–1860) was a Scottish civil servant, government actuary and the first president of the Institute of Actuaries.

John was born under the name Finlayson, however, was better known under the name of Finlaison.

== Early life ==
John Finlaison, eldest son of Donald Finlayson and Isabella Sutherland, was born in Thurso, Caithness on 27 August 1783.

His father died from an attack of brain fever on 28 November 1790, at the early age of twenty-nine, leaving his mother a widow, with three children John (seven years), Christian (three years) and William (four months old).

== Thurso ==
At the age of fifteen he was removed from school and apprenticed to Mr Donald Robeson, a writer [solicitor] in the town of Thurso, Scotland. Through his apprenticeship, John acquired a considerable amount of professional knowledge and learned about regular business habits.

John had a passion for reading at a young age. Much of his leisure hours were devoted to reading, however, during this period in Thurso, books were scarce and expensive. There was no circulating library in the town and, if there were, these were private libraries among the upper classes. Under these circumstances John made the acquaintance of a baker, whose brother was connected with Mackay’s circulating library in Edinburgh. The baker organised for boxes of books to be brought to Thurso, which was to John's delight.

== Ackergill ==
In 1802 John was appointed factor for Sir Benjamin Dunbar (afterwards Lord Duffus) at Ackergill in Scotland. The young pupil showed great quickness and aptitude for instruction and soon became a favourite with his teacher.

Sir Dunbar's whole estates along with that of the Earl of Caithness was entrusted to John's management when he was only nineteen years of age.

== Edinburgh ==
He held this appointment as factor for about twelve months and in August 1804, proceeded to Edinburgh in Scotland where he obtained a clerkship in the office of Mr. Alexander Glen, a writer to the Signet. It is here in the south of Scotland where John is thought to have begun signing his name as Finlaison.

During his stay in Edinburgh, John became attached to his employer's sister Elizabeth, daughter of the Rev. Alexander Glen, Minister of Dirleton.

To prevent the possibility of opposition from relatives, they informed no one of their marriage intentions and John received the offer of an appointment under the board of naval revision, which enabled him to marry her at once.

== London ==
=== Admiralty ===
John Finlaison and Elizabeth Glen wed in London, England, in September 1804.

In July 1805, he entered the government service as a clerk to the Naval Commission, the Admiralty. Very soon after his appointment in the Admiralty, he settled a competent annuity on his mother, which relieved her from anxiety for her subsistence during the remainder of her days. His son, Alexander Glen Finlaison (1806–1892), who was born at Whitehall on 25 March 1806. Alexander went on to also become an author and an authority on insurance statistics.

John was shortly thereafter promoted to be first clerk to the commission, and filled that office till the board closed its labours in August 1808. For some time previously he had also acted as secretary to a committee of the board, and in that capacity, although but twenty-three, he framed the eleventh and twelfth reports of the commission (Eleventh and Twelfth Reports of the Commissioners for Revising the Civil Affairs of His Majesty's Navy, 1809; Parl. Papers, 1809, vol. vi.), and was the sole author of the system for the reform of the victualling departments. The accounts had seldom been less than eighteen months in arrears, but by Finlaison's system they were produced, checked, and audited in three weeks, when the saving made in Deptford yard only in the first year, 1809, was 60,000l.

In 1809 he was employed to devise some plan for arranging the records and despatches at the admiralty, and after nine months of incessant application produced a system of digesting and indexing the records by which any document could be immediately found. This plan met with such universal approval that it was adopted by France, Austria, and Russia, and its inventor received as a reward the order of the Fleur-de-lys from Louis XVIII in 1815 (Baron Charles Dupin, Voyages dans la Grande-Bretagne, 1821, pt. ii. vol. i. pp. 65–67). In the same year he was appointed keeper of the records and librarian of the admiralty, and became reporter and précis writer on all difficult and complicated inquiries arising from day to day.

During the twelve years while he held this post he was also engaged in many other confidential duties. He was desired by Lord Mulgrave to prepare the materials for a defence of the naval administration before parliament in 1810, and with three months' labour collected a mass of information which enabled Mulgrave to make a successful defence. In 1811, Finlaison compiled an exact account of all the enemy's naval forces. Such information had never before been obtained with even tolerable accuracy. Experience proved it to be correct, and it was quoted in parliament as an authority. In the same year he was employed to investigate the abuses of the sixpenny revenue at Greenwich Hospital, a fund for the support of the out-pensioners, and in his report showed that by other arrangements, as well as by the reform of abuses and the abolition of sinecure places, the pensions might be much increased. The subject of the increase of the salaries of the government clerks having twice been forced on the notice of parliament, John Wilson Croker in 1813 directed Finlaison to fully inquire into the case of the admiralty department, when, after six months of close attention, he completed a report, upon which was founded a new system of salaries in the admiralty.

In 1814 he compiled the first official ‘Navy List,’ a work of great labour, accuracy, and usefulness. It was issued monthly, and he continued the duty of correcting and editing it until the end of 1821.

In 1815 Dr. Barry O'Meara, physician to Napoleon Bonaparte at St. Helena, commenced a correspondence with Finlaison, his private friend, on the subject of the emperor's daily life.

From 1817 to 1818, John was occupied in framing a biographical register of every commissioned officer in the navy, in number about six thousand, describing their services, merits, and demerits; this work he engrafted on to his system of the digest and index, where it formed a valuable work of reference for the use of the lords of the admiralty. He introduced into the naval record office a hitherto unknown degree of civility towards the public and of readiness to impart information. Having as librarian found many valuable state papers relating to the American war, he was in 1813 induced to attempt the completion of Redhead Yorke's 'Naval History,’ which was intended to form a part of Campbell's 'Lives of the Admirals.' He carried out his design in part by continuing the history down to 1780. This portion of the work was printed for private circulation, but its further progress was abandoned.

On 1 September 1819, Finlaison made a first report to Nicholas Vansittart, in which he demonstrated the great loss that was sustained by the government in granting life annuities at prices much below their value, the loss in eleven years having been two millions sterling. His report was not printed till 1824, when he was directed to make further investigations into the true laws of mortality prevailing in England. The result of his studies was the discovery that the average duration of human life had increased during the century. His tables were also the first which showed the difference between male and female lives.

Before the close of 1819 he furnished the chancellor of the exchequer with a statement of the age of each individual in the receipt of naval half-pay or pensions, fourteen thousand persons, thence deducing the decrement of life among them. In 1821 Mr. Harrison employed him for several months in computations relative to the Superannuation Act, and in 1822 he was occupied in considerations relative to the commutation of the naval and military half-pay and pensions. The measure consequently suggested by him was finally established by negotiations with the Bank of England in 1823 for its acceptance of the charge for public pensions in consideration of the 'dead weight' annuity. All the calculations were made by him, and it was plainly stated in the House of Commons that in the whole establishment of the Bank of England there was not one person capable of computing the new annuity at the fractional rate of interest agreed upon.

=== Treasury ===
On 1 January 1822, he was removed from the admiralty to the treasury, and appointed actuary and principal accountant of the cheque department of the national debt office, the duties of which position he performed for twenty-nine years. For many years after he had sought to impress on the government the loss which the country was sustaining by the use of erroneous tables, he was treated with neglect and contempt, and it was only by the accidental production of one of his letters before Lord Althorpe's committee of finance in March 1828 that the matter was brought forward. This letter proved that the revenue was losing 8,000l. a week, and that this loss was concealed by the method of preparing the yearly accounts. The immediate suspension of the life annuity system took place, and, remodelled upon the basis of Finlaison's tables, it was resumed in November 1829 with a saving in five years of 390,000l.

In 1824, by the desire of the writer, the letters were burnt. Some copies of them, however, had fallen into other hands and were published in 1853 in a book entitled 'Napoleon at St. Helena and Sir Hudson Lowe.' Finlaison now completed a work on which he had been employed since 1812, the fund for the maintenance of the widows and orphans of all who were employed in the civil departments of the Royal Navy. Through Lord Melville's intervention his efforts terminated successfully in the establishment of the fund by order in council on 17 September 1819. The naval medical supplemental fund for the widows of medical officers also owed to him its existence and subsequent prosperity. Until 1829 he remained the secretary, when the directors treated him so ungenerously that he resigned, and by mismanagement this fund was ruined in 1860.

The success of these charities, together with his subsequent investigation into the condition of friendly societies, upon which he was employed by a select committee of the House of Commons in 1824, introduced him to a private practice among benefit societies; he constructed tables for many of these, furnished the scheme of some, and entirely constituted others. Among other societies with which he became connected were: the London Life, the Amicable Society, the Royal Naval and Military Life Assurance Company, and the New York Life Assurance and Trust Company. The government in 1808 instituted a new system of finance based upon the granting of life annuities, the tables used being the Northampton tables of mortality.

In 1831, his wife of almost 26 years, Elizabeth, daughter of the Rev. James Glen, died at Brighton. In 1831 he also made computations on the duration of slave and creole life, preliminary to the compensation made to the slaveowners on 1 August 1834. He was consulted by the ecclesiastical commissioners on the means of improving church property, on the question of church leases, and finally on the subject of church rates; he made various reports on these matters, and on one occasion was summoned to attend the cabinet to explain his views to the ministers.

On the passing of the General Registration Act in 1837, his opinion was taken on the details of the working of the scheme, and he was the first witness called before the parliamentary committee on church leases in the following year. In 1840, John's Grandson Alexander John Finlaison (1840–1900) was born.

=== The Institute of Actuaries ===
The first professional body representing actuaries, the Institute of Actuaries, was formed in 1848. John Finlaison was elected as the first president of the Institute of Actuaries on 14 October 1848 and retained that position until his death 12 years later.

On 29 January 1849, John gave the first inaugural presidential address to the Institute members at the first ordinary general meeting of the Institute of Actuaries.

Alexander John Finlaison, John's grandson, became a fellow of the Institute of Actuaries and was the institute's president between 1894 and 1896.

== Last years ==
In 1831, just two months after the death of his first wife, John Finlaison had married Caroline Davies (1804-1832), and subsequently married her sister Elizabeth Davies (1807–1896), daughters of Thomas Davies of Waltham Abbey. He occupied a country house, Alghers House, now demolished, at Loughton, Essex, on the site of which a blue plaque has been placed by the Town Council and Institute of Actuaries.

He retired from the public service in August 1851, after serving nearly fifty years in the government service and employed his remaining days as Institute president and studying his favourite topics of scripture chronology and the universal relationship of ancient and modern weights and measures.

Finlaison died at his residence on 13 April 1860, after unexpectedly suffering a congestion of the lungs, aged 77. He is buried in St Nicholas' Church, Loughton. John Finlaison is remembered for his contributions to the actuarial profession in the United Kingdom.

== Publications and reports ==
1. Report of the Secretary to the Supplemental Fund for the Relief of the Widows and Orphans of the Medical Officers of the Royal Navy, 1817.
2. Life annuities: Report of John Finlaison, Actuary of the National Debt, on the evidence and elementary facts on which the tables of life annuities are founded, etc. - London, 1829. - 69p. - (HC 122); Report from the Select Committee on life annuities (HC 284).
3. Tables for shewing the amount of contribution for providing relief in sickness and old age, for payments at death, and endowments for children. Computed by John Finlaison, and recommended by J.T. Pratt. - London, 1833.
4. John Tidd Pratt, John Finlaison and Griffith Davies. 'Instructions for the establishment of friendly societies with a form of rules and table applicable thereto'. 1835. - 32p.
5. Northampton Equitable Friendly Institution. 'Rules of the Northampton Equitable Friendly Institution'; with tables calculated by ... J.T. Beecher and J. Finlaison, etc. 1837.
6. Commissioners for the Reduction of the National Debt. Memorandum (second memorandum) from the Actuary of the National Debt [i.e. John Finlaison] ... on the subject of ecclesiastical leases. 1837.
7. Account of some Applications of the Electric Fluid to the Useful Arts by A. Bain, with a Vindication of his Claim to be the First Inventor of the Electro-Magnetic Printing Telegraph, and also of the Electro-Magnetic Clock, 1843.
8. Annuity tables based on data of about 1839-1843 [manuscript by John Finlaison]. : 8 vols.
9. Tables for the use of Friendly Societies, for the Certificate of the Actuary to the Commissioners for the Reduction of the National Debt. Constructed from the original computations of J. Finlaison, by A. G. Finlaison, 1847.
10. John Finlaison has also produced some lyrical poems of considerable merit.
