= William Willmer Pocock =

British architect

William Willmer Pocock (8 May 1813 – 18 September 1899) was a British architect.

He was born in Knightsbridge in Middlesex, England, the son of the architect William Fuller Pocock (1779–1849) and his wife Fanny née Willmer. In 1865 he stood unsuccessfully as the Liberal candidate in the 1865 General Election in Guildford in Surrey and unsuccessfully again as the Liberal candidate against Conservative Richard Garth in the 1866 by-election in again Guildford. In 1883 Pocock was the Master of the Worshipful Company of Carpenters.

On 6 November 1840 he married builder's daughter Sophia Archbutt (1815–1889) at St Luke's church in Chelsea in London. Their children were: William Archbutt Pocock (1842–1901); Sophia Elizabeth Pocock (1844–); Alfred Willmer Pocock (1847–1906); Alice Mary Pocock (1851–1934); Lucy Maude Pocock (1852–); Maurice Henry Pocock (1854–1921), and Emma Clare Pocock(1856–1866). His great-grandson was the author H. R. S. Pocock.

In 1877 the architect Joseph Lancaster Ball was articled to Pocock.

W W Pocock died at his home in Tunbridge Wells in 1899. There is a stained glass window memorial dedicated to Pocock at Wesley's Chapel on the City Road in London.

== Buildings ==
Pocock was responsible for the design of, among others:

- The Metropolitan Tabernacle, London
- The hall of the Worshipful Company of Carpenters in the City of London
- Wesleyan Chapel, Market Square, Sevenoaks, Kent (1852; now in secular use)
- Wesleyan Chapel, St Peter Street, Winchester, Hampshire (1864; now in secular use)
- Wesleyan Chapel, Sandown, Isle of Wight (1865–66; now in secular use)
- Central Methodist Church, Hastings, East Sussex (1875; demolished 1980)
- Wesleyan Chapel, St Peter's Road, Petersfield, Hampshire (1871; now the church hall of St Peter's Church)
- Wesleyan Methodist church, Aldershot, Hampshire (1877)
- Sackville Road Methodist Church, Bexhill-on-Sea, East Sussex (1896)

== Publications ==
- Darwinism a Fallacy (1891)
- A Layman's View of the Higher Criticism of the Pentateuch (1894)
- A Sketch of the History of Wesleyan-Methodism in Some of the Southern Counties of England (1885)
- Chertsey Abbey (1858)
