= Institute of Actuaries =

UK professional body

The Institute of Actuaries was one of the two professional bodies which represented actuaries in the United Kingdom. The institute was based in England, while the other body, the Faculty of Actuaries, was based in Scotland. While the Institute and Faculty of Actuaries were separate institutions, they worked very closely together, and their professional qualifications and actuarial standards were identical. On 25 May 2010, voting members of the institute who took part in a ballot voted to merge the institute with the faculty, thus creating the Institute and Faculty of Actuaries, which came into being on 1 August 2010. The Institute of Actuaries ceased to exist on that date.

== Establishment of the Institute of Actuaries ==
The actuaries of a number of life assurance companies established the Institute of Actuaries in London on the 8th of July 1848. The Institute of Actuaries was the oldest actuarial professional body in the world.

In July 1884, the Institute of Actuaries was granted a royal charter. The royal charter confirmed the institute's role and the right to confer qualifications, i.e. the Fellow of the Institute of Actuaries (FIA). Since then there has been an underpinning concept of professional behaviour and the implicit right, or even duty, to discipline members who did not conduct themselves appropriately.

== Examinations ==
An actuarial qualification from the Institute of Actuaries consisted of a combination of the completion of various examinations and courses. The examinations were split into four sections: Core Technical (CT), Core Applications (CA), Specialist Technical (ST), and Specialist Applications (SA). Study material for the examinations is usually obtained through the official bookshop of the Institute of Actuaries or through The Actuarial Education Company (ActEd), a subsidiary of BPP Actuarial Education Ltd.

In addition to examinations and courses, it was required that the candidate both complete at least three years work as an actuary and be at least 23 years of age, for one to qualify as a “Fellow of the Institute of Actuaries” (FIA)

=== Core Examinations ===
The Core Technical section consisted of the 8 exams and a “Business Awareness Module,” CT9. These were usually first sat by a candidate and included the underlying mathematics involved in actuarial work as well as an introduction to financial and economic issues. These were also the most common exams for which candidates may get exemptions. While these were the first exams, candidates coming from a less mathematical background often find these more difficult than the later ones due to the mathematical theory content. Topics covered include annuities, stochastic modelling, time series, and economics.

The Core Applications section consisted of two exams and a modeling course, CA2, that focus on the application of concepts learned, especially to insurance companies. This included the communications model, CA3, which tested the candidate on their ability to communicate complex actuarial concepts to others.

=== Specialist Examinations ===
The Specialist Technical section represented the first time the candidate had a choice of which exams to take. The candidate chose two from the various actuarial specialist subjects i.e. Health and Care, Life Insurance, General Insurance, Pensions, Finance or Investments and further technical knowledge on said subjects is attained.

The Specialist Applications section allowed the candidate to choose one area for which they take the SA paper and attain full Fellowship; leading to many referring to this as the “Fellowship paper.” However, as the rules on the ordering of examinations were relaxed, this examination may be taken before taking some earlier examinations resulting in candidates qualifying on other papers.

== List of Examinations ==
The following list will be replaced by a new curriculum structure from 31 December 2018.

=== Core Technical Stage ===
- CT1 – Financial Mathematics
- CT2 – Finance and Financial Reporting
- CT3 – Probability and Mathematical Statistics
- CT4 – Models
- CT5 – Life Contingencies
- CT6 – Statistical Models
- CT7 – Business Economics
- CT8 – Financial Economics
- CT9 – Business Awareness

=== Core Applications Stage ===
- CA1 – Actuarial Risk Management
- CA2 – Model Documentation, Analysis and Reporting
- CP3 – Communication Practice

=== Specialist Technical Stage ===
- ST1 – Health and Care Specialist Technical
- ST2 – Life Insurance Specialist Technical
- ST3 – General Insurance Specialist Technical
- ST4 – Pensions and other Benefits Specialist Technical
- ST5 – Finance and Investment Specialist Technical A
- ST6 – Finance and Investment Specialist Technical B
- ST7 – General Insurance – Reserving and Capital Modelling Specialist Technical
- ST8 – General Insurance – Pricing Specialist Technical
- ST9 – Enterprise Risk Management Specialist Technical

=== Specialist Applications Stage ===
- SA0 – Research Dissertation Specialist Applications
- SA1 – Health and Care Specialist Applications
- SA2 – Life Insurance Specialist Applications
- SA3 – General Insurance Specialist Applications
- SA4 – Pensions and other Benefits Specialist Applications
- SA5 – Finance Specialist Applications
- SA6 – Investment Specialist Applications

=== UK Practice Modules ===
For students working in the UK only

- P0 – Generic UK Practice Half Module
- P1 – Health and Care
- P2 – Life Insurance
- P3 – General Insurance
- P4 – Pensions
- P5 – Finance
- P6 – Investment

== University-based examinations ==
A student may choose to complete an accredited actuarial science degree at an undergraduate or at a postgraduate level through a number of recognised universities. Successful students may offer proof of having covered the topics whilst at university and students may be granted exemptions from certain professional examinations from the Institute of Actuaries.

Depending on the university, a different number of courses may be recognised for exemption. The examinations and the exemption pass level for the examinations is usually externalised by members of the Institute and Faculty of Actuaries.

Naturally, the quality of the courses and lecturing at these universities are a determinant as to whether the course is recognised by the Institute and Faculty of Actuaries.

Most universities offering actuarial science courses also require the student in addition to complete various other related topics, including statistics, mathematics, applied mathematics, economics and accounting for recognition of an actuarial degree.

Upon completion of the university degree, students would then complete all remaining examinations through the Institute of Actuaries to qualify as an actuary and become a Fellow of the Institute of Actuaries (FIA).

== Membership Categories ==
In total there were approximately 15700 members of the Institute of Actuaries falling into the following categories.

- Affiliates were non-actuary members of the Institute of Actuaries who are kept up-to-date with the developments within the Actuarial Profession through publications and affiliates are able to participate in meetings, research and conferences;
- Student actuaries were members of the institute who are taking exams but have not attained the rank of Associate;
- Associates were members who had completed the CT and CA stages of exams and have completed one year's worth of relevant work-based skills experience. There were about 500 Associates in the institute. They bear the letters AIA after their names;
- Fellows were "fully qualified" members of the institute who had met the training demands by both completing all the examinations and meeting the work experience requirements. Fellows and Associates have the right to describe themselves as an actuary. There were about 9500 Fellows in the institute. They bear the letters FIA after their names;
- Honorary Fellows were voted on by the Council if it feels are appears to be able to render assistance in promoting the objects of the institute and who is not professionally engaged in practice as an actuary.

== Criticism ==
Following the near collapse of the Equitable Life Assurance Society, the government commissioned Derek Morris, the former head of the Competition Commission, to look into the failings of the actuarial profession and make recommendations for reform (2005). His report highlighted concerns about the process by which the profession had sought to keep its syllabus and teaching materials up to date, about the way that ‘entrenched commercial interests’ had hindered the development of the institute's education policy, referring to 'an insularity that constrained the extent and effectiveness of input from academics, other professions and those in wider fields of practice'.

The Review proposed a regime of independent oversight of the institute's regulation of the profession by the Financial Reporting Council.

== Presidents of the Institute of Actuaries ==
- 1848–1860 John Finlaison (1783–1860)
- 1860–1867 Charles Jellicoe (1804–1882)
- 1867–1870 Samuel Brown (1812–1875)
- 1870–1872 William Barwick Hodge (1802–1885)
- 1872–1875 Robert Tucker (1815–1875)
- 1875–1878 John Hill Williams (1814–1887)
- 1878–1882 Arthur Hutcheson Bailey (1823–1912)
- 1882–1886 Thomas Bond Sprague MA LLD (1830–1920)
- 1886–1888 Archibald Day (1830–1904)
- 1888–1890 William Sutton MA (1842–1898)
- 1890–1892 Benjamin Newbatt (1834–1896)
- 1892–1894 Augustus Hendrik (1834–1905)
- 1894–1896 Alexander John Finlaison CB (1840–1900)
- 1896–1898 Thomas Emley Young BA FRAS (1843–1933)
- 1898–1900 Henry William Manly (1844–1914)
- 1900–1902 Charles Daniel Higham(1849–1935)
- 1902–1904 William Hughes (1839–1912)
- 1904–1906 Henry Cocburn (1848–1936)
- 1906–1908 Frank Bertrand Wyatt (1853–1929)
- 1908–1910 Sir George Francis Hardy KCB (1855–1914)
- 1910–1912 Sir Gerald Hemmington Ryan, 1st Baronet (1861–1937)
- 1912–1914 Frederick Schooling (1851–1937)
- 1914–1916 Ernest Woods (1855–1932)
- 1916–1918 Samuel George Warner (1858–1928)
- 1918–1920 Geoffrey Marks CBE (1865–1938)
- 1920–1922 Sir Alfred William Watson KCB (1870–1936)
- 1922–1924 William Peyton Phelps MA (1865–1942)
- 1924–1926 Arthur Digby Besant BA (1869–1960)
- 1926–1928 Sir Joseph Burn KBE (1871–1950)
- 1928–1930 Abraham Levine MA (1870–1949)
- 1930–1932 Harold Moltke Trouncer MA (1871–1948)
- 1932–1934 Sir William Palin Elderton KBE PhD (Oslo) (1877–1962)
- 1934–1936 Charles Ronald Vawdrey Coutts (1876–1938)
- 1936–1938 Henry Brown MA (1876–1943)
- 1938–1940 Henry John Percy Oakley MC (1878–1942)
- 1940–1942 William Penman MBE (1880–1970)
- 1942–1944 Henry Edward Melville (1883–1976)
- 1944–1946 Reginald Claud Simmonds (1888–1969)
- 1946–1948 Sir Andrew Herrick Rowell MA (1890–1973)
- 1948–1950 Sir George Henry Maddex KBE (1895–1982)
- 1950–1952 Frederick August Andrew Menzler CBE BSc (1888–1968)
- 1952–1954 Walter Frank Gardner CBE (1900–1983)
- 1954–1956 John Farrant Bunford MA (1901–1992)
- 1956–1958 Charles Florestan Wood (1905–1979)
- 1958–1960 Frank Mitchell Redington MA (1906–1984)
- 1960–1962 John Henry Gunlake CBE (1905–1990)
- 1962–1964 Kenneth Ascough Usherwood CBE MA (1904–1988)
- 1964–1966 Sir Herbert Tetley KBE CB MA (1908–1999)
- 1966–1968 Bernard Benjamin PhD (1910–2002)
- 1968–1970 James Basil Holmes Pegler TD BA (1912–1992)
- 1970–1972 Ronald Sidney Skerman CBE BA (1914–2002)
- 1972–1974 Geoffrey Heywood MBE BA
- 1974–1976 Gordon Vernon Bayley CBE (1920–2004)
- 1976–1978 Charles Michael O'Brien MA
- 1978–1980 Peter Edward Moody CBE (1918–2004)
- 1980–1982 Antony Robin Napier Ratcliff
- 1982–1984 Colin Stewart Sinclair Lyon MA
- 1984–1986 Peter Gerald Moore PhD DSc
- 1986–1988 Marshall Hayward Field CBE
- 1988–1990 Roger David Corley CBE BSc
- 1990–1992 Hugh Hedley Scurfield MA
- 1992–1994 Leonard John Martin CBE
- 1994–1996 Christopher David Daykin CB MA
- 1996–1998 Duncan George Robin Ferguson MA
- 1998–2000 Paul Noel Thornton MA
- 2000–2002 Peter Nigel Stuckey Clark MA (1947–2006)
- 2002–2004 Jeremy Goford MA
- 2004–2006 Michael Pomery
- 2006–2008 Nicholas John Dumbreck
- 2008–2010 Nigel Masters

== See also ==
- Actuary
- List of learned societies
- Staple Inn – the institute's headquarters in London, which date from the 16th century.
