= William Fuller Pocock =

English architect

- Born: 1779; London
- Died: 29 October 1849 (aged 69–70); London
- Occupation: Architect

William Fuller Pocock (1779 – 29 October 1849) was an English architect.

== Biography ==
Pocock was the son of a builder. He was born in 1779 in the city of London. He was apprenticed to his father, and then entered the office of C. Beazley. His first essays in art were landscape-paintings; but at the age of twenty he had begun to work as an architect. From 1799 to 1827 he exhibited designs of minor works at the Royal Academy, the most ambitious of which was a ‘Design for a Temple of Fame.’ In 1820–2 he designed the hall of the Leathersellers' Company in St. Helen's Place, and in 1827 the priory at Hornsey. The headquarters of the London militia, Bunhill Row, were designed by him; the Wesleyan Centenary Hall in Bishopsgate Street Within (1840); Christ Church, Virginia Water; and a great number of smaller works. Pocock died on 29 October 1849 in Trevor Terrace, Knightsbridge, London.

He published:

- ‘Architectural Designs for Rustic Cottages,’ London, 1807, 4to; of which new editions were published in 1819 and 1823.
- ‘Modern Finishings for Rooms,’ London, 1811, 4to; also republished in 1823.
- ‘Designs for Churches and Chapels,’ London, 1819, 4to.
- ‘Observations on Bond of Brickwork’ (1839), written for the Institute of British Architects, of which society he was an early member.

His son William Willmer Pocock was also an architect.
