= Margaret McPhun =

Scottish suffragette (1876–1960)

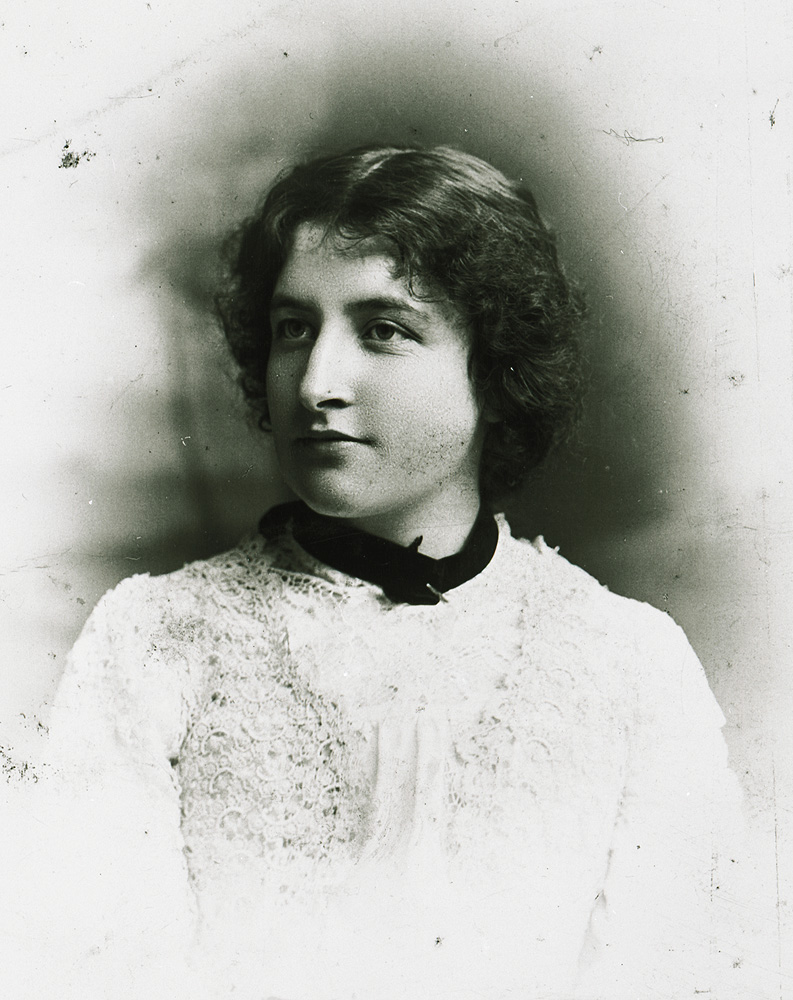
- Born: Margaret Pollock McPhun; 8 July 1876; Glasgow, Scotland, United Kingdom of Great Britain and Ireland
- Died: 1960 (aged 83–84)
- Other names: Margaret Campbell
- Education: University of Glasgow
- Known for: Scottish suffragette
- Relatives: Frances McPhun

Margaret Pollock McPhun (8 July 1876 – 1960) was a Scottish suffragette from Glasgow who served two months in Holloway Prison in London and composed a poem about another imprisoned activist Janie Allan.

== Life ==
McPhun was born on 8 July 1876. Her father was a Glasgow councillor and timber merchant. She and her sister, Frances, joined the Women's Social and Political Union (WSPU) in 1909, and she was the Scottish WSPU press secretary from 1912 to 1914. They were amongst dozens jailed for smashing government office windows in March 1912. The sisters had both attended the University of Glasgow, where Margaret had studied psychology and obtained an MA in 1897.

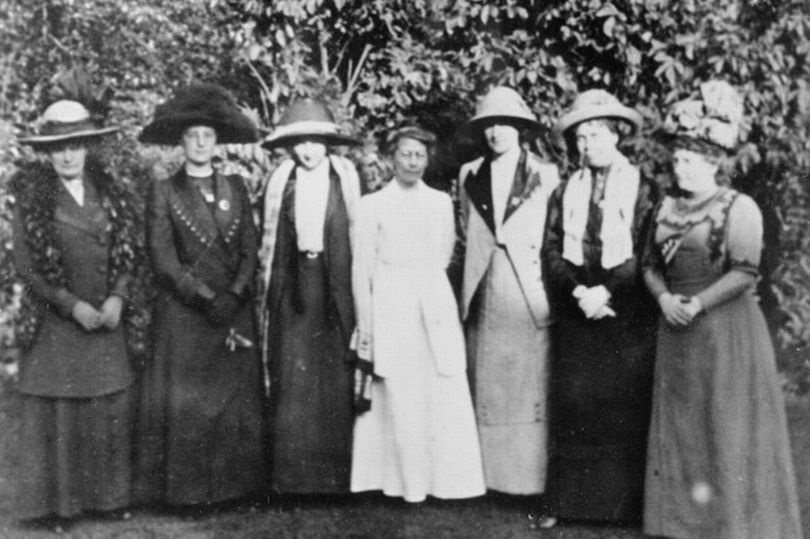
(L - R) Helen Crawfurd, Janet Barrowman, Margaret McPhun, Mrs A.A. Wilson, Frances McPhun, Nancy A. John and Annie Swan.

The sisters used the name "Campbell" to hide their background when they were arrested. When they were released from Holloway Prison after two months, they were given hunger strike medals 'for Valour' by the WSPU to record their hunger strikes, though the sisters had agreed that they would choose to drink from a cup to avoid being force fed through a nasal tube.

In 2023, the medals belonging to the sisters were put on display at Glasgow Women's Library as part of an exhibition to celebrate women’s activism. The library had purchased the hunger strike medal belonging to Maud Joachim, whose medal featured in the exhibition, entitled: We Deserve A Medal: Militant Suffrage Activism at the library (1 February-31 May 2024).

Margaret composed a poem about a fellow prisoner named Janie Allan who enjoyed popular support in Scotland. The poem was titled "To A Fellow Prisoner (Miss Janie Allan)", and it was included in the poetry anthology Holloway Jingles published by the Glasgow branch of the WSPU later that year.

== Bibliography ==
- Norquay, Glenda (1995). Voices and Votes: A Literary Anthology of the Women's Suffrage Campaign. Manchester University Press. ISBN 0-7190-3975-4.
- Elizabeth Crawford, The Women's Suffrage Movement: A Reference Guide 1866-1928, 1998 ISBN 0415239265
