= Capital Requirements Directives =

EU prudential capital and supervision rules for banks and investment firms

Directive 2013/36/EU
- European Union directive
- Text with EEA relevance
- Title: on access to the activity of credit institutions and the prudential supervision of credit institutions and investment firms
- Made by: European Parliament and Council
- Made under: Article 53(1) of the TFEU.
- Journal reference: OJ L 176, 27 June 2013, p. 338–436

History
- Date made: 26 June 2013
- Implementation date: 18 July 2013
- Applies from: 31 December 2013

Preparative texts
- EESC opinion: OJ C 68, 6.3.2012, p. 39–44

Other legislation
- Replaces: Directive 2006/48/EC and Directive 2006/49/EC (among others)
- Amends: Directive 2002/87/EC
- Amended by: Directive 2014/17/EU and Directive 2014/59/EU

The Capital Requirements Directives (CRD) for the financial services industry have introduced a supervisory framework in the European Union which reflects the Basel II and Basel III rules on capital measurement and capital standards.

Member States have progressively transposed, and firms of the financial service industry thus have had to apply, the CRD from 1 January 2007. Institutions were allowed to choose between the initial basic indicator approach, which increases the minimum capital requirement in Basel I approach from 8% to 15% and the standardised approach, which evaluates the business lines as a medium sophistication approaches of the new framework. The most sophisticated approaches, Advanced IRB approach and AMA or advanced measurement approach for operational risk were available from January 2008. From this date, all concerned EU firms had to comply with Basel II.

The new CRD IV package entered into force on 17 July 2013: this updated CRD simply transposes into EU law the latest global standards on bank capital adequacy commonly known as Basel III, which builds on and expands the existing Basel II regulatory base. CRD IV commonly refers to both the EU Directive 2013/36/EU and the EU Regulation 575/2013.

The Capital Requirements Directives superseded the EU's earlier Capital Adequacy Directive that was first issued in 1993.

== Previous CRD packages ==
=== CRD I ===
In 2000, seven Banking Directives and their amending Directives were replaced by one single Banking Directive (2000/12/EC), which aimed to improve the clarity and transparency of the EU legislation and to create a kind of "European Banking Act". The adoption of the Basel II guidelines in 2004 was followed at EU level by a recast of the Banking Directive on the one hand (Directive 2006/48/EC) and the Capital Adequacy Directive (Directive 93/6/EEC) on the other hand (Directive 2006/49/EC). These two Directives were officially adopted on 14 June 2006 and published in the Official Journal on 30 June 2006. Both Directives entered into force on 20 July 2006.

=== CRD II ===
On 16 September 2009, the Council and the European Parliament officially adopted Directive 2009/111/EC, which is part, together with Directives 2009/27/EC and 2009/83/EC, of the second legislative package aimed at ensuring the financial soundness of banks and investment firms.

=== CRD III ===
On 24 November 2010, the Council and the European Parliament officially adopted Directive 2010/76/EU on capital requirements for the trading book and for re-securitisations and the supervisory review of remuneration policies. Directive 2010/76/EU was to be implemented in two phases. The first, which affects the remuneration provisions, as well as a number of other ones dealing with the extension of some pre-existing minimum capital requirements, had to be implemented by 1 January 2011. The remaining provisions had to be implemented by 31 December 2011.

== CRD IV ==
On 17 July 2013, the CRD IV package was transposed —via a Regulation (Regulation (EU) No 575/2013 on prudential requirements for credit institutions and investment firms (CRR)) and a Directive (Directive 2013/36/EU on access to the activity of credit institutions and the prudential supervision of credit institutions and investment firms)— the new global standards on bank capital (the Basel III agreement) into EU law, entered into force. This is the current legislation on banking prudential requirements.

== Assessment and criticism ==
Think-tanks such as the World Pensions Council have argued that European powers such as France and Germany pushed dogmatically and naively for the adoption of the Basel II recommendations, adopted in 2005, transposed in European Union law through the Capital Requirements Directive (CRD). In essence, they forced European banks, and, more importantly, the European Central Bank itself, to rely more than ever on the standardised assessments of "credit risk" marketed aggressively by two US credit rating agencies—Moody's and S&P—thus using public policy and ultimately taxpayers' money to strengthen anti-competitive duopolistic practices akin to exclusive dealing. European governments have abdicated most of their regulatory authority in favour of a non-European, highly deregulated, private cartel.

== See also ==
- European Union banking union

== Sources ==
- https://web.archive.org/web/20060711060130/http://ec.europa.eu/internal_market/bank/regcapital/index_en.htm
- https://web.archive.org/web/20130627202127/http://ec.europa.eu/internal_market/bank/regcapital/legislation_in_force_en.htm
