= British banking law =

British banking law refers to banking law in the United Kingdom, to control the activities of banks.

== History ==
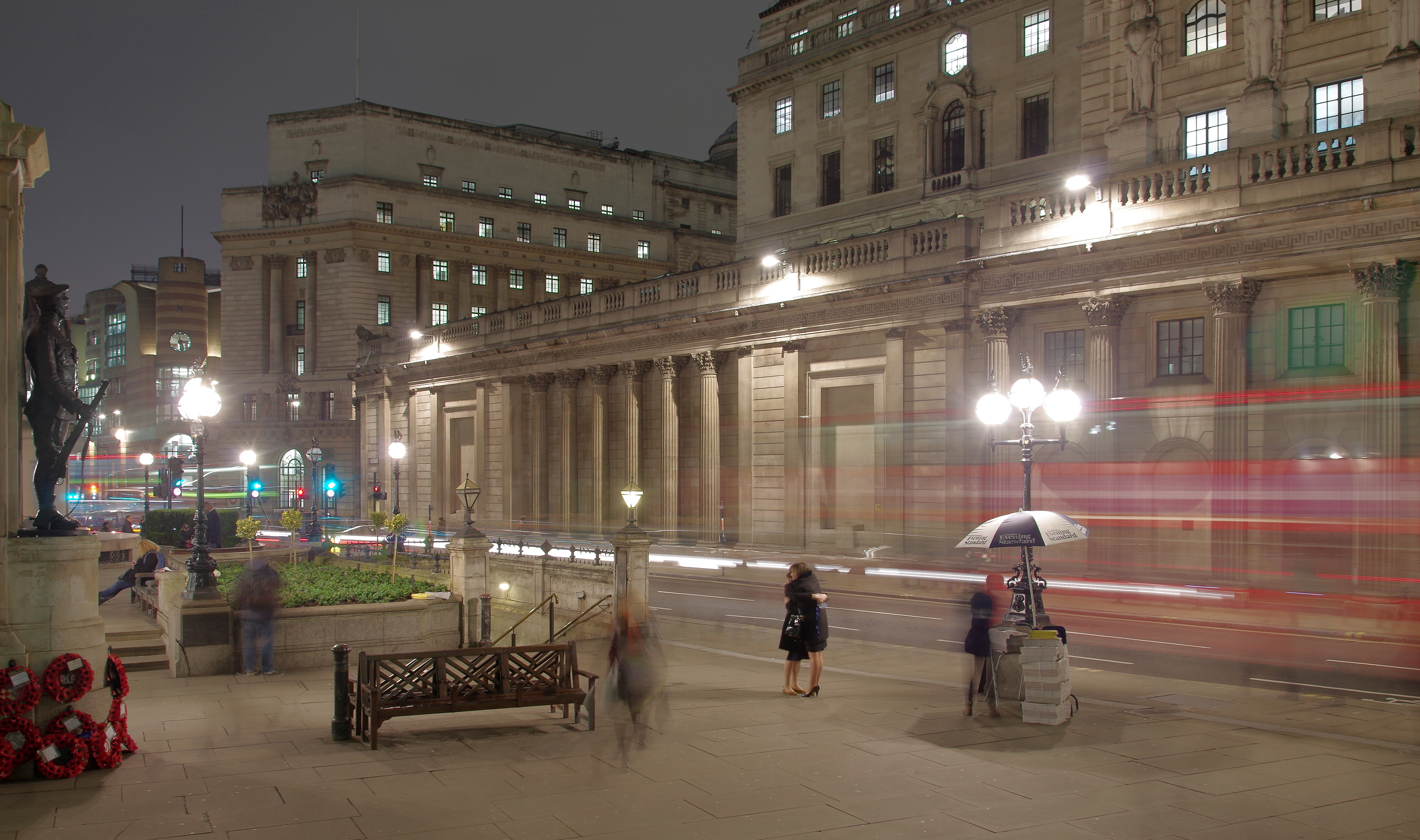
The Bank of England acts as the UK's central bank, influencing interest rates paid by private banks, to achieve targets in inflation, growth and employment.

The Bank of England was originally established as a corporation with private shareholders under the Bank of England Act 1694, to raise money for war with Louis XIV, King of France. After the South Sea Company collapsed in a speculative bubble in 1720, the Bank of England became the dominant financial institution, and acted as a banker to the UK government and other private banks.

The Bank of England could, simply by being the biggest financial institution, influence interest rates that other banks charged to businesses and consumers by altering its interest rate for the banks' bank accounts. The Bank of England Act 1716 widened its borrowing power. The Bank Restriction Act 1797 removed a requirement to convert notes to gold on demand. The Bank Charter Act 1844 gave the bank sole rights to issue notes and coins. It also acted as a lender through the 19th century in emergencies to finance banks facing collapse. Because of its power, many believed the Bank of England should have more public duties and supervision. The Bank of England Act 1946 nationalised it. Its current constitution, and guarantees of a degree of operational independence from government, is found in the Bank of England Act 1998.

- Macmillan Committee (1929)

== Central bank ==
UK banking has two main parts. First, the Bank of England administers monetary policy, influencing interest rates, inflation and employment, and it regulates the banking market with HM Treasury, the Prudential Regulation Authority and Financial Conduct Authority. Second, there are private banks, and some non-shareholder banks (co-operatives, mutual or building societies), that provide credit to consumer and business clients. Borrowing money on credit (and repaying the debt later) is important for people expand a business, invest in a new enterprise, or purchase valuable assets more quickly than by saving. Every day, banks estimate the prospects of a borrower succeeding or failing, and set interest rates for debt repayments according to their predictions of the risk (or average risk of ventures like it). If all banks together lend more money, this means enterprises will do more, potentially employ more people, and if business ventures are productive in the long run, society's prosperity will increase. If banks charge interest that people cannot afford, or if banks lend too much money to ventures that are unproductive, economic growth will slow, stagnate, and sometimes crash. Although UK banks, except the Bank of England, are shareholder or mutually owned, many countries operate public retail banks (for consumers) and public investment banks (for business). The UK used to run Girobank for consumers, and there have been many proposals for a "British Investment Bank" (like the Nordic Investment Bank or KfW in Germany) since the 2008 financial crisis, but these proposals have not yet been accepted.

=== Central bank governance ===
Under the Bank of England Act 1998 section 1, the bank's executive body, the "Court of Directors" is "appointed by Her Majesty", which in effect is the prime minister. This includes the Governor of the Bank of England (currently Andrew Bailey) and up to 14 directors in total (currently there are 12, 9 men and 3 women). The Governor may serve for a maximum of 8 years, deputy governors for a maximum of 10 years, but they may be removed only if they acquire a political position, work for the bank, are absent for over 3 months, become bankrupt, or "is unable or unfit to discharge his functions as a member". This makes removal hard, and potentially a court review. A sub-committee of directors sets pay for all directors, rather than a non-conflicted body like Parliament.

=== Interest rates ===
The Bank of England provides finance and support to, and may influence interest rates of the private banks through monetary policy. Possibly the Bank's most important function is administering monetary policy. This affects growth and employment. Under BEA 1998 section 11 its objectives are to (a) "maintain price stability, and (b) subject to that, to support the economic policy of Her Majesty’s Government, including its objectives for growth and employment." Under section 12, the Treasury issues its interpretation of "price stability" and "economic policy" each year, together with an inflation target. To change inflation, the Bank of England has three main policy options. First, it performs "open market operations", buying and selling banks' bonds at differing rates (i.e. loaning money to banks at higher or lower interest, known "discounting"), buying back government bonds ("repos") or selling them, and giving credit to banks at differing rates. This will affect the interest rate banks charge by influencing the quantity of money in the economy (more spending by the central bank means more money, and so lower interest) but also may not. Second, the Bank of England may direct banks to keep different higher or lower reserves proportionate to their lending. Third, the Bank of England could direct private banks adopt specific deposit taking or lending policies, in specified volumes or interest rates. The Treasury is, however, only meant to give orders to the Bank of England in "extreme economic circumstances". This should ensure that changes to monetary policy are undertaken neutrally, and artificial booms are not manufactured before an election.

=== Private bank oversight ===
- Bank of England Act 1998
- Three Rivers DC v Bank of England
- Bank of Credit and Commerce International

== Private bank governance ==
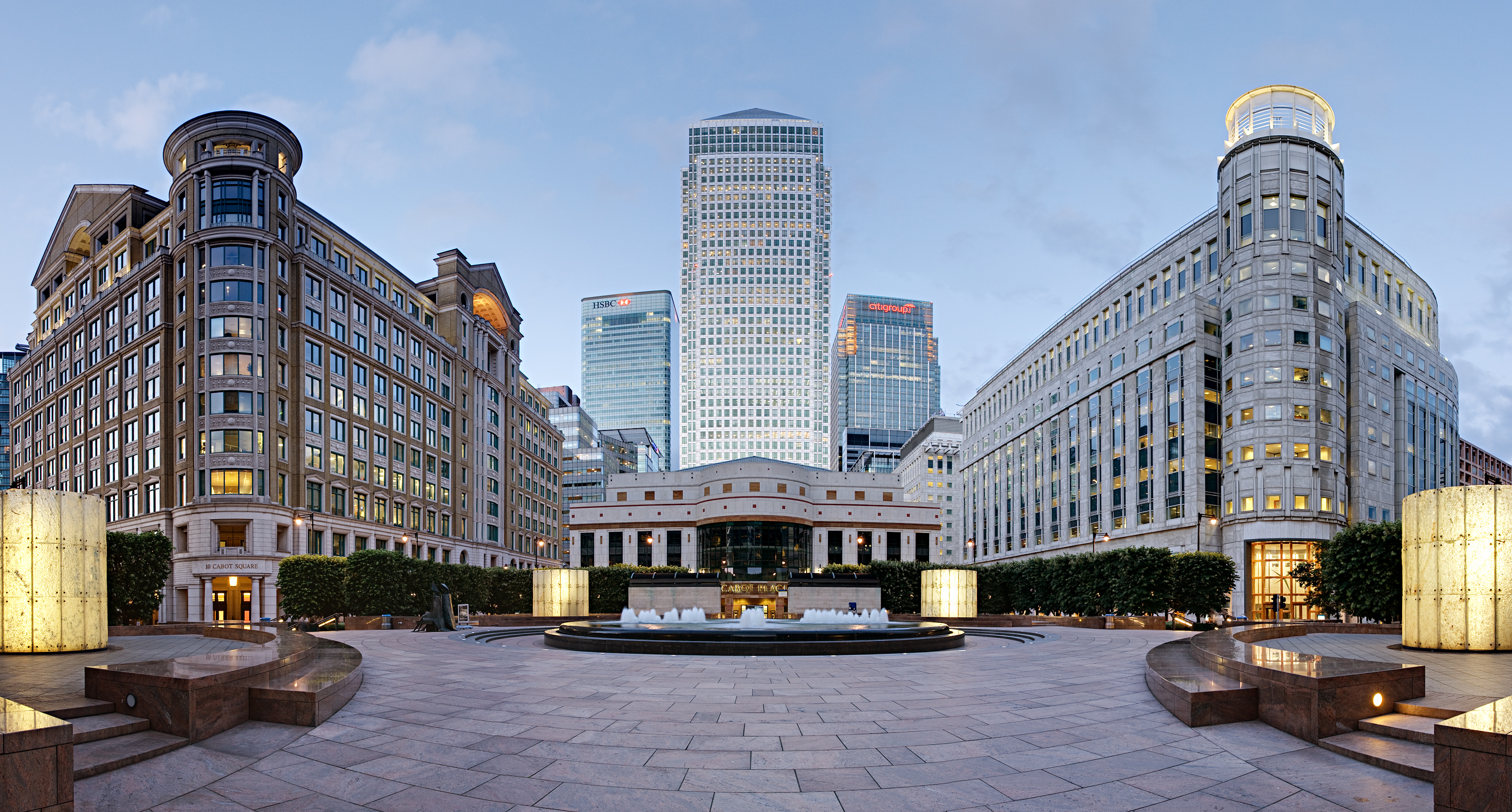
The largest UK banks are HSBC, Barclays, NatWest and Lloyds Bank.

Outside the central bank, banks are mostly run as profit-making corporations, without meaningful representation for customers. This means, the standard rules in the Companies Act 2006 apply.

=== Directors and shareholders ===
Directors are usually appointed by existing directors in the nomination committee, unless the members of a company (invariably shareholders) remove them by majority vote. Bank directors largely set their own pay, delegating the task to a remuneration committee of the board. Most shareholders are asset managers, exercising votes with other people's money that comes through pensions, life insurance or mutual funds, who are meant to engage with boards, but have few explicit channels to represent the ultimate investors. Asset managers rarely sue for breach of directors' duties (for negligence or conflicts of interest), through derivative claims.

Concerns about "short-termism" have been written about by the Kay Review (2014) on short and long term thinking in equity markets, and the Walker Review (2009) on bank governance. These have not yet examined the responsibility of institutional investors, and asset managers who vote with other people's money.

=== Employee rights ===
Since the Credit Institutions Directive 2013, there are some added governance requirements beyond the general framework: for example, duties of directors must be clearly defined, and there should be a policy on board diversity to ensure gender and ethnic balance. If the UK had employee representation on boards, there would also be a requirement for at least one employee to sit on the remuneration committee, but this step has not yet been taken. The Credit Institutions Directive 2013 (2013/36/EU article 95 states "If employee representation... is provided for by national law, the remuneration committee shall include one or more employee representatives."

=== Licensing and passport ===
There is some public oversight through the bank licensing system. Under the Financial Services and Markets Act 2000 section 19 there is a "general prohibition" on performing a "regulated activity", including accepting deposits from the public, without authority. The two main UK regulators are the Prudential Regulation Authority and the Financial Conduct Authority. Once a bank has received authorisation in the UK, or another member state, it may operate throughout the EU under the terms of the host state's rules: it has a "passport" giving it freedom of establishment in the internal market.

== Customer rights ==
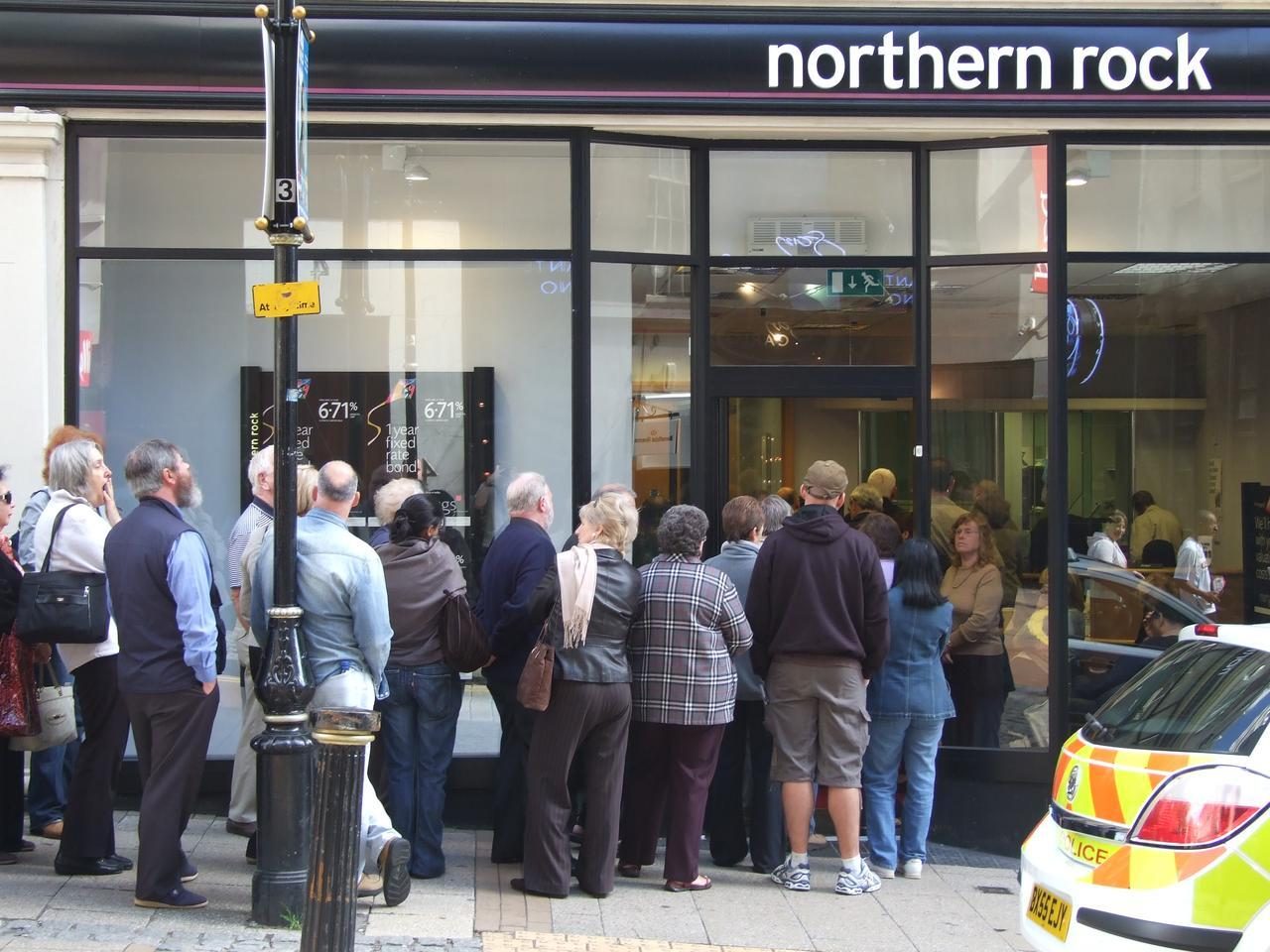
Government ultimately guarantees the banking system. By 2009, the UK government had been forced to nationalise Northern Rock, Bradford & Bingley, the Royal Bank of Scotland and part of HBOS-Lloyds TSB. The Banking Act 2009 contains a system to stop systemic crisis from banker insolvency.

While banks perform an essential economic function, supported by public institutions, the rights of bank customers have generally been limited to contract.

=== Customer accounts ===
In general terms and conditions, customers receive very limited protection. The Consumer Credit Act 1974 sections 140A to 140D prohibit unfair credit relationships, including extortionate interest rates. The Consumer Rights Act 2015 sections 62 to 65 prohibit terms that create contrary to good faith, create a significant imbalance, but the courts have not yet used these rules in a meaningful way for consumers. Most importantly, since Foley v Hill the courts have held customers who deposit money in a bank account lose any rights of property by default: they apparently have only contractual claims in debt for the money to be repaid. If customers did have property rights in their deposits, they would be able to claim their money back upon a bank's insolvency, trace the money if it had been wrongly paid away, and (subject to agreement) claim profits made on the money. However, the courts have denied that bank customers have property rights. The same position has generally spread in banking practice globally, and Parliament has not yet taken the opportunity to ensure banks offer accounts where customer money is protected as property.

=== Deposit protection ===
Because insolvent banks do not enable customers to recover their money as a property right (only contract), governments have found it necessary to publicly guarantee depositors' savings. This follows the model, started in the Great Depression, the US set up the Federal Deposit Insurance Corporation, to prevent bank runs. In 2017, the UK guaranteed deposits up to £85,000, mirroring an EU wide minimum guarantee of €100,000.

== Markets ==
=== Insolvency ===
Because of the knock-on consequences of any bank failure, and because bank debts are locked into a network of international finance, government has found it practically necessary to prevent banks going insolvent. This system began with the Banking (Special Provisions) Act 2008, emergency legislation for the nationalisation of Northern Rock, which was recast the following year. Under the Banking Act 2009 if a bank is going into insolvency, the government may (and usually will if "the stability of the financial systems" is at stake) pursue one of three "stabilisation options". The Bank of England will either try to ensure the failed bank is sold onto another private sector purchaser, set up a subsidiary company to run the failing bank's assets (a "bridge-bank"), or for the UK Treasury to directly take shares in "temporary public ownership". This will wipe out the shareholders, but will keep creditors' claims intact.

All other standard rules of the Insolvency Act 1986 apply, including wrongful trading provisions, and the rules in the Company Director Disqualification Act 1986.

=== Capital requirements ===
One method to prevent bank insolvencies, following the implementation of Basel III, has been to require banks hold more money in reserve based on portfolio risk. EU rules in Capital Requirements Regulation 2013 achieve this in some detail, for instance requiring proportionally less in reserves if sound government debt is held, but more if mortgage-backed securities are held. It is not clear that a lack of capital is the root cause of the problem, although higher capital requirements are favored by the Basel Committee on Banking Supervision.

=== Competition law ===
- Competition Act 1998
- Libor scandal

== See also ==
- UK company law
- UK enterprise law
- Bank regulation in the United States
- Glass–Steagall Act of 1933
- Depository Institutions Deregulation and Monetary Control Act of 1980
