= Third-party management =

Business process for managing vendor risk

Third-party management (also known as vendor risk management, third-party risk management or TPRM) is the process by which organizations oversee and manage relationships with external entities that provide goods, services or other support, including software as a service. These entities – referred to as third parties – can include vendors, suppliers, contractors, consultants, and affiliates. The goal of third-party management is to assess, monitor, manage, and mitigate the risks posed by these relationships while ensuring they deliver value and comply with applicable laws and standards.

== Third-party risks ==
Organizations across a wide range of industries, including financial services, healthcare, manufacturing, government, technology, and higher education, rely on third parties to perform critical functions. These relationships can improve operational efficiency and provide access to new technologies, but they also introduce risks that must be proactively managed. These risks commonly include information and cybersecurity risk, compliance and legal risk, operational risk, financial risk, reputation risk, strategic risk, transaction risk, and geopolitical/location risk. Third parties can be both 'upstream' (suppliers and vendors) and 'downstream', (distributors and re-sellers) as well as non-contractual parties.

Firms do not have to conduct critical activities to be considered a 'third party'; a cleaning services firm responsible for maintaining a company's office space is a third party as much as a primary supply-chain supplier. The role or size of the third party is not as important as the nature of the relationship, the criticality of its activities, the level of access it has to sensitive data or property, and a company's accountability for inappropriate actions of its third parties. A cleaning company with access to a CEO's filing cabinet represents a different but still significant risk relative to a supplier who provides a critical component to the production line.

A non-critical service provider – such as an air-conditioning contractor – operating in a country with low corruption risk may erroneously be considered a low risk. However, if that contractor has poor cyber-security and is able to submit invoices to a customer electronically across the customer's firewall, this may represent a high cyber risk to the customer company. Target Corporation's December 2013 data breach, in which approximately 70 million Target customers' credit and debit card information was stolen, highlights the cyber security risk posed by innocent third parties – even in low risk countries such as the US. Hackers exploited an HVAC contractor with poor cyber-security who conducted electronic payments with Target and thus had access to behind the firewall.

Due to trends towards specialization and outsourcing, companies have increasingly focused on core competencies are engaging greater numbers of third parties to perform key functions in their business value chain. This pattern creates greater numbers of critical third-party relationships which – in the case of companies with tens of thousands and even hundreds of thousands of third-party relationships – can become cumbersome to monitor and manage.

== Regulation ==
Due to regulatory requirements, third-party management is most prevalent in the financial sector. The use of third-party management systems is mandated by the Office of the Comptroller of the Currency (OCC), Federal Deposit Insurance Corporation (FDIC), and Federal Reserve for U.S. national banks and federal savings associations as part of the 2023 Interagency Guidance on Third-Party Relationships: Risk Management. The British Financial Conduct Authority (FCA) requires, under the SYSC 8.1 'Outsourcing Requirements', that critical functions conducted by third parties must be continuously monitored.

The healthcare sector also has growing regulatory requirements that require third-party management. HIPAA, the Health Insurance Portability and Accountability Act, sets the standard for protecting private patient data. There are regulations around the saving and storing of PHI (Protected Health Information), which can be even more valuable than credit card information. The HITECH Act, signed in 2009, requires increased privacy and security obligations and extends those obligations to business associates.

While other industries are not required by law to have third-party management systems in place, most non-financial companies are bound by anti-bribery/anti-corruption (ABAC) and other regulations, such as the U.S. Foreign Corrupt Practices Act and United Kingdom Bribery Act 2010. Consequently, many of them manage their third parties and have adopted third-party-management solutions.
