= Capital Adequacy Directive =

Directive 93/6/EEC
- European Union directive
- Title: on the capital adequacy of investments firms and credit institutions
- Made by: Council of the European Communities
- Made under: first and third sentences of Article 57 (2) of TEEC
- Journal reference: OJ L 141, 11 June 1993, p. 1–26

History
- Date made: 15 March 1993
- Implementation date: 1 July 1995
- Applies from: 31 December 1995

Other legislation
- Amended by: Directive 98/33/EC, Directive 2002/87/EC, Directive 2004/39/EC and Directive 2005/1/EC
- Replaced by: Directive 2006/49/EC

The Capital Adequacy Directive was a European directive that aimed to establish uniform capital requirements for both banking firms and non-bank securities firms, first issued in 1993 and revised in 1998. These was superseded by the Capital Requirements Directives starting in 2006.

== History ==
The original 93/6/EEC (CAD1) directive was amended by 98/31/EEC (CAD2), to incorporate banks' own estimate of capital using value-at-risk techniques. Annex 1 models were virtually unchanged by CAD2, so there has been no change in the CAD1 regime.

A third revision of the directive 2006/49/EC was issued on 14 June 2006 and would use the new name of Capital Requirements Directive (CRD). This came into force together with recast of a related banking directive on 20 July 2006. The main change was the adoption of Basel II guidelines into the directive.

In 2009, 2010, and 2013, three further revisions were issued known as CRD II, CRD III, and CRD IV. The legislation on this matter current as of 2016 is known as the CRD IV package (Capital Requirements Regulation and Directive).
