= Standardized approach =

In Basel II, a set of international recommendations on bank regulation, standardized approach (British English: standardised approach) may refer to:

- Standardized approach (credit risk), a broad methodology for measuring credit risk based on external credit assessments
- Standardized approach (operational risk), a method of calculating a business line's capital requirements as a percentage of its gross income

== See also ==
- Basel II
