= Institute of Operational Risk =

British professional body

The Institute of Operational Risk was established in January 2004 and in accordance with the requirements stipulated by the UK Secretary of State in regard to the formation of an Institute. It was formed as a professional body in response for a need to promote and maintain standards of professional competency in the discipline of operational risk management.

== Establishment ==
This need had originally been identified and addressed through the pioneering work of the Operational Risk Research Forum (ORRF). Having established a high standard and reputation for operational risk management, training and education, ORRF sought permission from the UK Secretary of State to form The Institute of Operational Risk. With support from the British Bankers' Association (BBA), the Bundesanstalt für Finanzdienstleistungsaufsicht (BaFin), Cambridge University Judge Institute of Management, International Swaps and Derivatives Association (ISDA) and the Financial Services National Training Organisation (FSNTO) the Secretary of State granted ORRF permission to form the Institute of Operational Risk.

Since incorporation, the stated mission of the IoR has been to promote the development and discipline of Operational Risk and to foster and maintain investigations and research into the best means and methods of developing and applying the discipline and to encourage, increase, disseminate and promote knowledge, education and training and the exchange of information and ideas.

== Management & membership ==
Stewardship of the newly formed IoR was entrusted to Peter Brown, David Clark, Victor Dowd, John Thirlwell and Brendon Young, who were either senior financial regulators, senior members of the BBA and/or ORRF respectively. Between 2004 and 2006, with Brendon Young as Chairman, membership of the IoR steadily increased. As membership continued to grow, it became necessary to refine the original governance structure and in late 2006, a new two tier framework was proposed. This change in governance was significant as it recognised the fact the Institute had evolved as a professional body of national repute to one of international standing. This refined governance framework was formally adopted by IoR members and Brendon, as IoR Chairman, oversaw this change. After forming the IoR together with three years as the Institute’s first Chairman, Brendon Young stepped down in 2007. Under new stewardship, the IoR continues to grow. The IoR open to all with an interest in Operational Risk and it has four grades of membership. As a professional body, the IoR is run by members for the benefit of members. Membership details are available on the membership section of the IoR website which are given in outline here as: Fellow; Professional Member; Member and Associate.

- Fellow
  This is an honorary award for those who have actively contributed to the development of the Institute and/ or individuals of high-standing within the discipline of Operational Risk who meet the requirements as from time to time determined by the Institute.
- Professional Member
  This is open to those with a minimum of two years relevant experience in risk management and who are currently working in an operational risk management position.
- Member
  This is open to those with a minimum of two years practical experience and who are currently active in a risk related role. This may include individuals currently working in internal audit or compliance. This category is also open to those working in academia.
- Associate
  This is open to those who are working towards achieving a higher grade of membership or actively engaged in research, education and training, or an associated field or interest in Risk Management. Typically, the Institute views this category for those people who are starting out on their career and who are interested in learning more about operational risk management.

In 2019 the IOR became part of the wider Institute of Risk Management (www.theirm.org) in order to support further international growth.

== See also ==
- Governance, risk management, and compliance
