= CAEL Rating =

US bank financial solvency evaluation system

The CAEL Rating System is a standard used by the United States Federal Deposit Insurance Corporation (FDIC) to evaluate the financial solvency of US banks. The rating is based on the bank's capital adequacy, asset quality, profitability, and liquidity, and is reported as a composite score. The composite score runs on a scale of 1 to 5, with 1 being excellent and 5 being indicative of imminent regulatory action.

These numbers are useful to the banking public as a means to easily evaluate the health of their institution. There are multiple outlets from which to gather this information; however, there also exist many private rating firms whose ratings use the same name but are in no way affiliated with the FDIC. One such firm is Bankrate.
