= Basel IA =

Basel IA was proposed as an intermediate between the then current Basel I accord and the Basel II accord, which was being implemented at the time. Basel IA would have been more risk sensitive than Basel I but would not be as complex as the advanced approach under Basel II.

On July 20, 2007, by a deal between the various US banking regulators (The Federal Reserve, the Office of the Comptroller of the Currency, the Office of Thrift Supervision and the Federal Deposit Insurance Corporation) it was decided to drop the proposed Basel IA and allow Basel II Standardised in its place.

The US initially proposed that banks would need to use the advanced approach only if they were to implement Basel II. The idea of Basel IA was to enable smaller US banks to adopt a methodology that is more risk sensitive than Basel I that they are currently using for calculating capital adequacy. The Fed chairman mentioned that smaller banks who do not wish to move to Basel II Advanced or Basel IA could continue to operate under Basel I.
