= National Bank Surveillance System =

United States banking monitoring system

The National Bank Surveillance System is a computerized, off-site monitoring system developed by the U.S. Office of the Comptroller of the Currency (OCC) "to assist in the early detection of problem banks and bank management," for the purpose of initiating early corrective action.

Essentially an early-warning system, the NBSS was first implemented in 1975. It produces Bank Performance Reports (BPRs) as its primary analytical tool.
