= Loan line sheet =

Work document used by bank examiners

A loan line sheet is a work document used by bank examiners who can be either bank regulators or bank "third party" or consulting examiners. The line sheet represents the examiner's review of a bank loan, whether a loan to a company or to an individual. The line sheet initially contains basic information about the particular loan in question, such as the original amount of the loan, the current balance, the monthly payment, etc. The examiner then uses the line sheet to review the loan file, and makes his/her own notations and analysis on the line sheet to document the review of the loan.

A line sheet, or line guide, can also be a schedule that a company keeps for guidance showing the top lines that can be written inclusive of reinsurance on different classes of risk.
