= Business risks =

Uncertainty in profitability and operations

Business risks are the possibility of a commercial entity making losses or inadequate profits due to uncertainties, for example: changes in tastes, changing preferences of consumers, staff (de)motivation, strikes, increased competition, changes in government policy, obsolescence etc. Every business organization faces various risk elements. Business risk implies uncertainty in profits or danger of loss and events that could pose unforeseen risk in the future which may cause a company to fail. Voluntary and not-for-profit organisations may face similar risks.

Business-risk factors may arise in different forms depending upon the nature of a company and of its activities. A manufacturing company, for example, may face risks affecting production, risks due to irregular supply of raw materials, machinery breakdown, labor unrest, etc. In marketing, risks may arise due to fluctuations in market prices, changing trends and fashions, errors in sales-forecasting, etc. In addition, there may be loss of assets of the firm due to fire, flood, earthquakes, riots or war and political unrest, which may cause unwanted interruptions in the business operations.

Business risks can have two major forms: internal risks (risks arising from the events taking place within the organization) and external risks (risks arising from the events taking place outside the organization):

- Internal risks arise from factors (endogenous variables, which can be influenced) such as:
  - human factors (talent management, strikes)
  - technological factors (emerging or sunset technologies)
  - physical factors (failure of machines, fire or theft)
  - operational factors (access to credit, cost-cutting, advertisement)
- External risks arise from factors (exogenous variables, which cannot be controlled) such as:
  - economic factors (market risks, pricing pressure)
  - natural factors (floods, earthquakes)
  - fickle fashion trends
  - political factors (compliance demands and regulations imposed by governments)

Though corporate entities may have an image of risk aversion, they may continue to stake their reputations and indulge in their gambling propensities by sponsoring competitive sports-teams.

Many business risks can interrelate. With the onset of the global Coronavirus pandemic in 2019, many firms fell victim to events arising as a result of the damage to the stock market. A lot of internal factors became prominent, including the much-needed transition to online communication within a business.

Change in the stock market in early 2020 highlights a specific example of external risks. Between late February and late March, out of 22 stock-market trading-days, there were 18 drastic stock-market jumps. Stock-market jumps may indicate lower stock stability and higher volatility. The uncertainty of whether or not a stock is secure indicates a risk of any certain business.

== Classification ==
The business risk is classified into five different main types

1. Strategic risk: They are the risks associated with the operations of that particular industry. These kind of risks arise from:
  1. Business environment: Buyers and sellers interacting to buy and sell goods and services, changes in supply and demand, competitive structures and introduction of new technologies.
  2. Transaction: Assets relocation of mergers and acquisitions, spin-offs, alliances and joint ventures.
  3. Investor relations: Strategy for communicating with individuals who have invested in the business.
2. Financial risk: These are the risks associated with the financial structure and transactions of the particular industry.
3. Operational risk: These are the risks associated with the operational and administrative procedures of the particular industry.
4. Compliance risk (legal risk): These are risks associated with the need to comply with the rules and regulations of the government.
5. Other risks: There would be different risks like natural disaster (floods) and others depend upon the nature and scale of the industry.
