= FDIC problem bank list =

List created by the FDIC

In American finance, the FDIC problem bank list is a confidential list created and maintained by the Federal Deposit Insurance Corporation which lists banks that are in jeopardy of failing. The list is closely monitored, and if problems continue with a listed bank, the FDIC takes control of the bank; it may then sell the problem bank to a stronger one, or liquidate the bank and pay off the depositors.

== Getting on the list ==
To get onto the FDIC problem bank list, a bank must receive a CAMELS rating by bank examiners of “4” or “5.” The CAMEL rates each element of Capital, Assets, Management, Earnings, and Liquidity from “1” to “5,” with “1” being the best and “5” being the worst. A composite rating is then assigned, and banks in the two lowest categories are placed on the FDIC's problem bank list.

== See also ==
- National Bank Surveillance System
