= Active Agenda =

Open source tool

- Developers: Dan Zahlis, Mattias Thorslund
- Preview release: 0.8.2-beta / February 29, 2007; 18 years ago
- Written in: XML, PHP
- Platform: Web platform
- Type: Risk management, Enterprise resource planning, High reliability organization
- License: Reciprocal Public License (RPL)

Active Agenda is an open source risk management tool. Active Agenda is designed to support operational risk management (ORM) in organizations and is optimized for high reliability organizations. It is a browser-based multi-user enabled software. Active Agenda includes approximately one hundred modules covering areas of the operational risk management process.

Active Agenda utilizes a custom code generator called "spec2app". The "spec2app" processor converts specifications written in XML into integrated Active Agenda modules utilizing PHP and MySQL. The code generator enables rapid development of extensions to the core application and simplifies customization, support, and maintenance.

== Release ==
Active Agenda was released on SourceForge in October 2006. The source code release coincided with Penton Media's publication of the project launch article titled "A Solution (R)evolution." In 2007, Active Agenda was named a "FAST 50" by the readers of Fast Company magazine.

== Recognition ==
In 2011, Active Agenda Founder, Dan Zahlis was named a "Risk Innovator" by RISK & INSURANCE magazine. The project received further distinction as a "Responsibility Leader" by Liberty Mutual

== See also ==
- High reliability organization
- Occupational safety and health
- Operational risk management
- Rapid application development
- Regulatory compliance
