= Bank examiner =

Financial professional

Bank Examiner
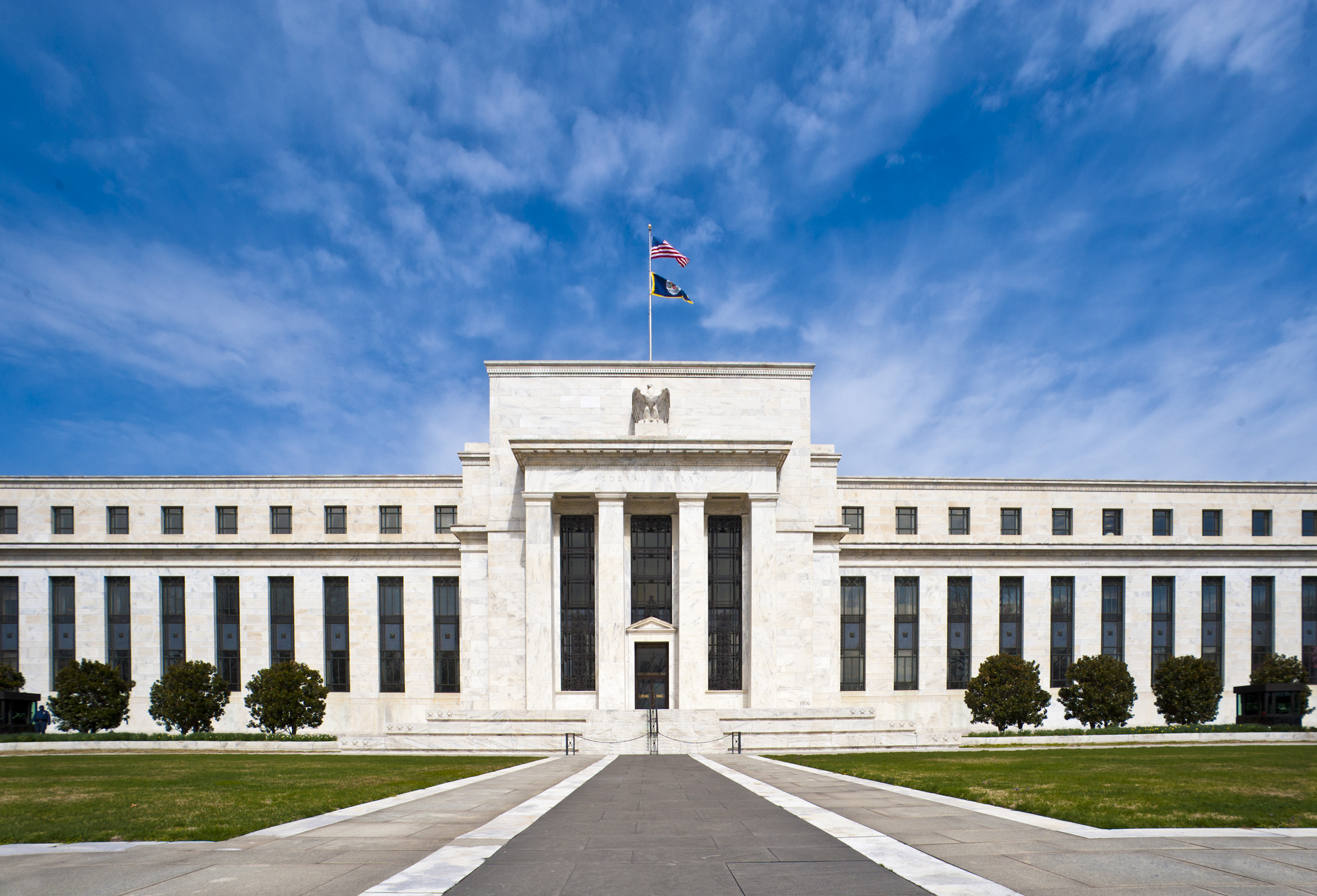
- Bank examiners may be employed by the Federal Reserve System in the US.

Occupation
- Occupation type: Financial analyst
- Activity sectors: Financial regulation, bank regulation, banking, regulatory compliance, financial crime, risk management, government

Description
- Competencies: Finance, accounting, judgment, teamwork, communication
- Education required: Bachelor's degree in economics, finance, accounting, or other related business field
- Related jobs: Auditor

A bank examiner is a financial professional who has the task of making sure that banks and savings and loan associations are operating legally and safely, in accordance with the bank regulations imposed on these institutions by the chartering level of government. In the United States, they may conduct supervision on behalf of a U.S. government agency, the Federal Reserve System, a state banking authority, or for the financial institutions themselves as internal auditors. The main duties of a bank examiner are to ensure that a bank's operations are legal and can provide financial stability. A bank examiner will also review financial statements, evaluate the level of risk associated with loans, and assess the management of a bank.

== History in the United States ==
William Prentiss Jr., Chief National Bank Examiner of the 15th Federal Reserve District (1938)

The early periods of U.S. history were characterized by extremely loose banking regulations, which contributed to multiple banking crises and economic recessions. This is commonly known as the Free Banking Era, a time when the bank examination profession did not exist in the United States. Eventually, the role of bank examiners was formalized by the National Banking Act of 1864, which formally established the Office of the Comptroller of the Currency (OCC) as the supervisor of all banks, whether chartered by a state government as a state bank or by the federal government as a national bank. Banks began to report financial information on a quarterly basis, and bank examiners were hired to inspect institutions. Early examiners of this era faced grueling travel by railroad, stagecoach, or horseback in order to conduct their on-site examinations. While the creation of the OCC helped stabilize the banking system, the post-American Civil War economy continued to present challenges to financial stability.

After the Banking Panic of 1907, the Federal Reserve Act of 1913 called for the creation of the Federal Reserve System. In addition to its central bank responsibilities, the Federal Reserve was also charged with supervising state-chartered banks that were members of the Federal Reserve System. Eventually, the effects of Great Depression also led to the enactment of the Banking Act of 1933, which created the Federal Deposit Insurance Corporation (FDIC) as a deposit insurer and supervisor of state-chartered banks that were not members of the Federal Reserve System.

State banking authorities shared oversight responsibilities with the Federal Reserve and FDIC over state-chartered banks, while the OCC alone maintained oversight of nationally chartered banks. The ranks of bank examiners grew significantly during this period, which is often called the Regulatory Era. Finally, due to the Great Recession and the Dodd–Frank Wall Street Reform and Consumer Protection Act, the Consumer Financial Protection Bureau (CFPB) was established in 2011. Among its other responsibilities, it shares supervisory authority with the OCC, Federal Reserve, FDIC, and states for banks with over $10 billion in total assets.

== Duties and functions ==
Bank examiners monitor and evaluate the financial condition of institutions and their compliance with relevant regulations and laws. They evaluate the quality of risk management practices, compliance with consumer protection and financial crime regulations, and management's ability to run the institution in a safe and sound manner. The bank examination process may include inspection of the facility and the bank's records, as well as fact-finding interviews with management. Bank examiners usually work on-site, traveling to various institutions and branches as scheduled or as requested, although some work may also be done through remote access. Frequency of examinations is determined by statute and the risk level of the institution. Complex banks may have teams of examiners stationed year-round in its offices to perform ongoing monitoring. The bank examiner is expected to be knowledgeable of finance and accounting principles (particularly forensic accounting), as well as the relevant banking procedures and protocols. In some cases, an examiner will have worked in bank management positions in the past. In the United States, it is a crime to obstruct a federal bank examination.

Bank examiners report findings to their employing agency, and usually to the board of directors and upper management of the examined institution. They are expected to provide analysis and evidence to substantiate their findings, in an objective and non-judgmental manner; and in particular to refer any serious violations of regulations to the appropriate levels of authority. Recommendations for corrective action can be made if warranted. Examiners, particularly those employed by a regulatory agency, may also assign supervisory ratings to institutions and place legal enforcement actions, civil money penalties, or other punishments for noncompliance.

== Hiring and training ==
Aspiring bank examiners are usually required to have an undergraduate degree in finance, accounting, economics, or related business field. In some cases, a background investigation may be performed on the candidate to assess their ability to protect sensitive information. Newly hired examiners must immediately comply with ethics rules that prohibit certain actions, such as holding ownership interests in bank companies or receiving loans from specified financial institutions.

While examiner training requirements vary depending on the employing agency, federal bank examiners in the United States are generally encouraged to complete rigorous training programs to become certified as commissioned examiners. This title indicates that the holder has a high level of general examination expertise and is empowered to serve in key roles such as examiner-in-charge. Examiner commissioning programs may demand several years of on-the-job training, formal classroom instruction, and knowledge tests on topics such as banking, accounting, and regulations. Once commissioned, bank examiners may have the opportunity to further develop specialties in large bank, asset management, IT security, anti-money laundering, capital markets, consumer protection, and other areas. They may also advance to management positions in their respective field offices.

== Notable incidents ==
=== Failure of First National Bank of Keystone - September 1, 1999 ===
As bank examiners from the Office of the Comptroller of the Currency began discovering fraud and risk management deficiencies at the First National Bank of Keystone in Keystone, West Virginia, bank officials began intimidating them by making verbal threats, taping conversations, forging emails from examiners, and hiring security guards to follow them around. The examiners requested, and received, U.S. Marshal Service protection as they continued their work. The Office of the Comptroller of the Currency examiners, and the Federal Deposit Insurance Corporation examiners who later joined them, ultimately uncovered the fraud and declared the bank insolvent. It was eventually closed down, with the FDIC as receiver. Subsequently, several bank directors went to federal prison for charges such as obstructing a bank examination and fraud. It was discovered that some bank records were buried in the ranch of one of the directors.

== See also ==
- Financial Regulation
- Banking Regulation
- Financial Crisis
- Bank Run
- Dodd-Frank Wall Street Reform and Consumer Protection Act
- Federal Financial Institutions Examination Council
- Federal Reserve System
- Office of the Comptroller of the Currency
- Federal Deposit Insurance Corporation
- Consumer Financial Protection Bureau
- National Credit Union Administration
- Conference of State Bank Supervisors
- Prudential Regulation Authority
- Financial Conduct Authority
