= Advanced measurement approach =

Advanced measurement approach (AMA) is one of three possible operational risk methods that can be used under Basel II by a bank or other financial institution. The other two are the Basic Indicator Approach and the Standardised Approach. The methods (or approaches) increase in sophistication and risk sensitivity with AMA being the most advanced of the three.

Under AMA the banks are allowed to develop their own empirical model to quantify required capital for operational risk. Banks can use this approach only subject to approval from their local regulators. Once a bank has been approved to adopt AMA, it cannot revert to a simpler approach without supervisory approval.

== Requirements ==
Also, according to section 664 of original Basel Accord, in order to qualify for use of the AMA a bank must satisfy its supervisor that, at a minimum:

- Its board of directors and senior management, as appropriate, are actively involved in the oversight of the operational risk management framework;
- It has an operational risk management system that is conceptually sound and is implemented with integrity; and
- It has sufficient resources in the use of the approach in the major business lines as well as the control and audit areas.

== The four data elements ==
According to the BCBS Supervisory Guidelines, an AMA framework must include the use of four data elements: (i) Internal loss data (ILD), (ii) External data (ED), (iii) Scenario analysis (SBA), and (iv) Business environment and internal control factors (BEICFs).

== Loss distribution approach ==
While AMA does not specify the use of any particular modeling technique, one of the most common approaches taken in the banking industry is the loss distribution approach (LDA). With LDA, a bank first segments operational losses into homogeneous segments, called units of measure (UoMs). For each unit of measure, the bank then constructs a loss distribution that represents its expectation of total losses that can materialize in a one-year horizon. Given that data sufficiency is a major challenge for the industry, annual loss distribution cannot be built directly using annual loss figures.

Instead, a bank will develop a frequency distribution that describes the number of loss events in a given year, and a severity distribution that describes the loss amount of a single loss event. The frequency and severity distributions are assumed to be independent. The convolution of these two distributions then give rise to the (annual) loss distribution.

== See also ==
- Basel II
- Basic indicator approach
- Operational risk
- Standardized approach (operational risk)
