= Market discipline =

Investor pressure that enforces financial prudence

Buyers and sellers in a market are said to be constrained by market discipline in setting prices because they have strong incentives to generate revenues and avoid bankruptcy. This means, in order to meet economic necessity, buyers must avoid prices that will drive them into bankruptcy and sellers must find prices that will generate revenue (or suffer the same fate).

Market discipline is a topic of particular concern because of banking deposit insurance laws. Most governments offer deposit insurance for people making deposits with banks. Normally, bank managers have strong incentives to avoid risky loans and other investments. However, mandated deposit insurance eliminates much of the risk to bankers. This constitutes a loss of market discipline. In order to counteract this loss of market discipline, governments introduce regulations aimed at preventing bank managers from taking excessive risk. Today market discipline is introduced into the Basel II Capital Accord as a pillar of prudential banking regulation.

The efficacy of regulations aimed at introducing market discipline is questionable. Financial bailouts provide implicit insurance schemes like too-big-to-fail, where regulators in central agencies feel obliged to rescue a troubled bank for fear of financial contagion. It can be argued that depositors would not bother to monitor bank activities under these favorable circumstances. There are numerous academic studies on this subject. The findings, at first, had mixed and somewhat discouraging results where market discipline did not appear to be an essential feature in banking. Later studies, though, when including some of the previously missing key aspects into the empirical analysis, supported the existence and significance of such a natural control mechanism unambiguously. Accordingly, depositors 'discipline' bank activities to some extent depending on the well functioning of financial markets and institutions.

== Introduction ==
Since 1990's there is an increase of interest among policymakers and academics for enhancing the environment for market discipline. The reason being: Financial engineering and technological improvements enabled financial intermediaries to be involved in overly complex and advanced financial operations. These activities become more and more costly to monitor and supervise from the regulatory agency perspective. This is precisely why regulators support the idea of including market discipline as another channel to complement regulatory policies. In a study reported to the Congress in 1983 by the FDIC, the challenge to the possibility of restructuring financial markets is stressed quite nicely:

"We must seek new ways, in the absence of rigid government controls on competition, to limit destructive competition and excessive risk-taking. There are only two alternatives. We can promulgate countless new regulations governing every aspect of bank behaviour and hire thousands of additional examiners to enforce them. This approach would undercut the benefits sought through deregulation, would favour the unregulated at the expense of the regulated, and would ultimately fail. The FDIC much prefers the other alternative: seeking ways to impose a greater degree of marketplace discipline on the system to replace outmoded government controls". (page:3)

Therefore, making the relevant financial data publicly available in a timely fashion will, supposedly, help investors to better evaluate bank condition by themselves and as such this will relieve the pressure of regulators and put it on the shoulders of the market investors and depositors.

The right amount of information release is essential. With too little information, there is no discipline. Too much information, on the other hand, may cause a bank run which might have devastating consequences. A timely, balanced amount of information is critical for the desired results.

At the Conference of Bank Structure and Competition on May 8, 2003, the then FED Chairman Alan Greenspan noted that transparency is not the same as disclosure. Relevant data shall be disclosed in a timely fashion for enhanced transparency:

"Transparency challenges market participants not only to provide information, but also to place that information in a context that makes it meaningful."

== Basel II ==
Basel II is a banking supervision accord in its final version as of 2006. It describes and recommends the necessary minimum capital requirements necessary to keep the bank safe and sound. It consists of three pillars to this aim:

1. Minimum (risk weighted) capital requirements
2. Supervisory review process
3. Disclosure requirements

The third pillar requires the bank activities to be transparent to the general public. For this, the bank is supposed to release relevant financial data (financial statements etc.) in a timely fashion to the public, for example, through its webpage. This might enable depositors to better evaluate bank condition (i.e. bank probability of failure) and diversify their portfolio accordingly. As such this pillar by itself is believed will enhance the role of market discipline in financial markets.

== Deposit Safety Nets ==
Deposit insurance in the U.S. was instituted in 1934 to restore depositor trust into the financial markets following the devastation of the Great Depression. It worked quite well for many decades in terms of preventing a major bank run and systemic risk.

In the last couple of decades there has been increased criticism about its benefits. Concerning market discipline, one can easily say that mispriced deposit insurance distorts the incentives of depositors to monitor bank risk taking activities. For example, 100% of deposits are under government guarantee (up to $100,000) in the U.S. compared to only 70% in England. The depositors in England, knowing that they will lose money when the bank they are investing in fails, will be more cautious than U.S. depositors and will monitor bank activities with vigilance.

The question that challenges policymakers is really what an optimal deposit insurance scheme might be. Moreover "How to design and implement it?"

== See also ==
- Moral hazard
- Too-big-to-fail
- Deposit insurance
- Basel II
- Bank condition
- Banking regulation
- CAMELS rating
