= The Journal of Operational Risk =

- Discipline: Finance
- Language: English

Publication details
- History: 2006–present
- Frequency: Bimonthly
- Impact factor: 0.576 (2015)

Standard abbreviations
- ISO 4: J. Oper. Risk

Links
- Journal homepage

The Journal of Operational Risk is a bimonthly peer-reviewed academic journal covering the measurement and management of operational risk. It was established in 2006 and is published by Incisive Risk Information. The editor-in-chief is Marcelo Cruz (Morgan Stanley). According to the Journal Citation Reports, the journal has a 2015 impact factor of 0.576.
