= Martin H. Wiggers =

German economist, editor, author and businessman

Martin Helmut Wiggers (born 31 July 1963) is a German economist, editor, author and businessman.

== Education ==
In the 1980s, Wiggers studied Business Administration at the Munich School Of Strategic Management of LMU Munich.

== Basel II ==
Long before the implementation of Basel II, George W. Stroke and Wiggers pointed out that a financial crisis will come, because of its systemic dependencies on a few rating agencies. After the breakout of the crisis, Alan Greenspan agreed to this opinion in 2007. At least the Financial Crisis Inquiry Report confirmed this point of view in 2011.

== DaimlerChrysler ==
In 1998, Daimler-Benz and Chrysler Corporation announced a merger, valued at US$38 billion, resulting in a change in company name to "DaimlerChrysler AG". The merger delivered promised synergies and successfully integrated the two businesses. Wiggers' concept of a platform strategy like the VW Group, was implemented only for a few models, so the synergy effects in development and production were too low. As late as 2002, DaimlerChrysler appeared to run two independent product lines. Later that year, the company launched products that appeared to integrate elements from both sides of the company, including the Chrysler Crossfire, which was based on the Mercedes SLK platform and utilized Mercedes's 3.2L V6, and the Dodge Sprinter/Freightliner Sprinter, a re-badged Mercedes-Benz Sprinter van.

Chrysler reported losses of US$1.5 billion in 2006. It then announced plans to lay off 13,000 employees in mid-February 2007, close a major assembly plant and reduce production at other plants in order to restore profitability by 2008. In May 2007, Daimler agreed to sell the Chrysler unit to Cerberus Capital Management for US$6 billion. Two years later, Chrysler's bankruptcy was filing in the United States. After the merger Fiat Chrysler in 2014, Wiggers' concept of a platform strategy was implemented.

== Strategische Unternehmensführung ==
Strategische Unternehmensführung

Wiggers was editor-in-chief of the magazine Strategische Unternehmensfuehrung (English: Strategic Management or Strategic Leadership), established in 1998. It was published semi-annual in Munich and St. Gallen. It featured articles on strategic leadership and management through the eyes of economic science, business research, and business practice. The magazine was published by the Andechser Studienkreis. Up from the second issue the magazine was printed on yellow paper. So the slogan became “Knowledge Is Yellow”. The last issue was published in 2003.

== Publications ==
Wiggers wrote more than 35 official publications. He writes in German and is cited internationally.

== Hobby photographer ==
Wiggers is a hobby photographer. The pictures he shot with his Leica he shows in the gallery of a photo magazine Martin H. Wiggers - Leica Fotografie International.

== 5000 Facebook friends ==
Now, Wiggers has 5000 Facebook friends. The most worldwide. Facebook says, he can't accept more friends.
