= Strategische Unternehmensführung =

- Editor-in-chief: Martin H. Wiggers
- Frequency: semi-annual
- Publisher: Andechser Studienkreis
- Total circulation: 1,000
- First issue: 1998
- Final issue: 2003
- Country: Germany, Switzerland
- Based in: Munich, St. Gallen
- Language: German
- ISSN: 1436-5812

The magazine Strategische Unternehmensführung (English: Strategic Management or Strategic Leadership) was established in 1998. It was published semi-annual in Munich and St. Gallen. It featured articles on strategic leadership and management through the eyes of economic science, business research, and business practice. The editor-in-chief was Martin H. Wiggers. The magazine was published by the Andechser Studienkreis. Up from the second issue the magazine was printed on yellow paper. So the slogan became “Knowledge Is Yellow”. The last issue was published in 2003.

== Content ==
The magazine Strategische Unternehmensführung featured articles on Strategic Leadership and Management. They took a critical look beside the mainstream by the view of business science, business research, and business practice. The topics were for example:

- Balanced Scorecard
- The Error Of The 'Faster, Cheaper Better' (German: Der Irrtum des 'Faster Cheaper Better')
- Economic Globalization (German: Globalisierung)
- Shareholder Value

== Authors and readers ==
The magazine's writers were for example:

- Werner Kirsch
- Michael Mirow
- George W. Stroke
- Martin H. Wiggers

The magazine was read from business executives, the board of directors of companies listed in the DAX, politicians of the Bavarian Government, and many others.
