= Double default =

Concept in banking

Double default occurs in banking, when the obligor and the guarantor fail to meet their obligations.

A debt default known as a "double default" occurs when both the borrower and the guarantor or supplier of credit insurance for the same receivable are at fault.

Double default is a financial term that refers to the default of both a bond issuer and the company that has provided a credit enhancement (such as a guarantee or insurance) for the bond.

A bond issuer is the entity that issues a bond, which is a type of debt security. A bond issuer is responsible for paying the bondholder (the person who holds the bond) the principal amount of the bond, as well as any interest payments due on the bond. If the bond issuer fails to make these payments, it is said to have defaulted on the bond.

A credit enhancement is a financial instrument or mechanism that is used to improve the creditworthiness of a bond. It can take the form of a guarantee or insurance provided by a third party, or it can be a structure that is designed to reduce the risk of default.
