= Standardized approach (operational risk) =

In the context of operational risk, the standardized approach or standardised approach is a set of operational risk measurement techniques proposed under Basel II capital adequacy rules for banking institutions.

Basel II requires all banking institutions to set aside capital for operational risk. Standardized approach falls between basic indicator approach and advanced measurement approach in terms of degree of complexity.

Based on Basel I, under the Standardised Approach, banks’ activities are divided into eight business lines: corporate finance, trading & sales, retail banking, commercial banking, payment & settlement, agency services, asset management, and retail brokerage. Within each business line, gross income is a broad indicator that serves as a proxy for the scale of business operations and thus the likely scale of operational risk exposure within each of these business lines. The capital charge for each business line is calculated by multiplying gross income by a factor (denoted beta) assigned to that business line. Beta serves as a proxy for the industry-wide relationship between the operational risk loss experience for a given business line and the aggregate level of gross income for that business line.

Business Line	Beta Factor
Corporate finance	18%
Trading and sales	18%
Retail banking	12%
Commercial banking	15%
Payment and settlement	18%
Agency services	15%
Asset Management	12%
Retail Brokerage	12%

The total capital charge is calculated as the three-year average of the simple summation of the regulatory capital charges across each of the business lines in each year. In any given year, negative capital charges (resulting from negative gross income) in any business line may offset positive capital charges in other business lines without limit.

In order to qualify for use of the standardised approach, a bank must satisfy its regulator that, at a minimum:

- Its board of directors and senior management, as appropriate, are actively involved in the oversight of the operational risk management framework;
- It has an operational risk management system that is conceptually sound and is implemented with integrity; and
- It has sufficient resources in the use of the approach in the major business lines as well as the control and audit areas.

In March 2016, the Basel Committee on Banking Supervision updated its proposal for calculating operational risk capital, introducing the Standardized Measurement Approach (“SMA”). Building upon its 2014 version, the SMA would not only replace the existing standardized approaches, but also the Advanced Measurement Approach. Under the SMA, regulatory capital levels will be determined using a simple formulaic method which facilitates comparability across the industry.

== See also ==
- Basic indicator approach
- Advanced measurement approach
- Operational risk
