= Performance report =

A performance report is a report on the performance of something. They are routinely produced by government bodies which, being financed by public money, are required to show that the money was spent efficiently and usefully. Such reports will contain performance indicators which measure the achievements of the organisation and its programmes. For example, for a police department, the report might show the number of arrests, number of convictions by crime category and the change in the crime rate.

== Health care ==
In the Clinton health care plan of 1993, it seemed that performance reports for hospitals and other health care providers would be national policy and many prototypes were developed and tested.
