= Credit Institutions Directive 2013 =

Directive 2013/36/EU
- European Union directive
- Title: Directive 2013/36/EU of the European Parliament and of the Council of 26 June 2013 on access to the activity of credit institutions and the prudential supervision of credit institutions and investment firms, amending Directive 2002/87/EC and repealing Directives 2006/48/EC and 2006/49/EC Text with EEA relevance.

History
- Date made: 26 June 2013

The Credit Institutions Directive (CID) is an EU law that aims to ensure banks are run prudently, and do not go insolvent. The CID was introduced as part of a package rules, following the 2008 financial crisis, with the Capital Requirements Regulation 2013, intended to increase the resilience of the EU banking industry.

== Summary ==
The directive governs access to deposit taking by banks and investment firms and covers supervisory powers and tools for competent authorities to use in the supervision of credit institutions, the process of prudential supervision of those institutions and, publication requirements for authorities that regulate and supervise institutions. The CID was required to become law in EU countries by 31 December 2013, two subsequent amendments have gone into effect by 29 December 2020 and 26 March 2020.

== Contents ==
=== Titles I-II, administration ===
Title I concerns definitions. Title II explains competent authorities to administer the Directive, decentralised within member states (e.g. the Financial Conduct Authority in the UK, the Bundesamt für Finanz in Germany).

=== Title III, Credit institutions ===
Title III sets out requirements to be active as a credit institution (especially, running a bank). Article 8 contains the key requirement for credit institutions to be authorised. Article 9 sets out prohibition on taking deposits without authority. Article 11 states that ‘Member States shall not require the application for authorisation to be examined in terms of the economic needs of the market.’ Article 12 sets the general minimum of €5 million initial capital, which may be lowered to no less than €1 million subject to conditions set by Member States. Article 14 states that authority depends on disclosing identities of shareholders or members with qualifying holdings, or of the largest 20 holders. Article 18 contains the exhaustive list of reasons for withdrawal of authorisation, including the condition of Article 18 (c) that the institution 'no longer fulfils conditions under which it was granted authority'.

=== Title V, freedom of establishment and freedom to provide services ===
Title V concerns the rights of establishment and freedom to provide services. Article 35, restates the right to establish a branch in another member state, a CI must notify authorities of home member state. Article 40 concerns reporting requirements that host member states can require. Article 43 adds that host states can take emergency precautionary measures in derogation from the general rights.

=== Title VI, relations with third countries ===
Article 47 sets out regulations in relation to third-country branches and conditions of access for credit institutions with such branches. Article 48 regulates cooperation with supervisory authorities of third countries.

=== Title VII, prudential and governance standards ===
Title VII concerns prudential supervision of credit institutions and corporate governance. Article 49 says that the basic position is that the home state of the credit institution is responsible for supervision. Article 50 requires collaboration on supervision among member state authorities. Article 73 contains provisions on internal capital. Article 74 says internal governance and recovery plans should be defined and transparent. Article 76 requires standards for the organisation and treatment of risks.

Articles 88 to 96 contain loose provisions on corporate governance. Under Article 88(1) there must be a segregation of management and supervision duties to prevent conflicts of interest, and (2) non-executive directors must be on the nomination committee for new appointees. Article 89 requires country by country reporting to disclose on (a) activities’ name and place (b) the credit institution's turnover (c) employees who are full time (d) profits and loss before tax (e) after tax (f) public subsidies received. Article 91 says management body members must have skills to do duties, ‘reflect an adequately broad range of experiences’ (2) spend enough time to do work (3) no more than one exec directorship and two non-exec directorships or four non-exec directorships (4) definitions (5) not counting non-commercial jobs (6) competent authorities can authorise an additional one (7) management must understand main risks (8) independence (9) training (10) the nomination-committee should ‘put in place a policy promoting diversity on the management board’ (11) with reference to article 435(2) of the Capital Requirements Regulation 575/2013 to benchmark diversity, and finally (12) the European Banking Authority will establish guidelines on time, knowledge, integrity, diversity, etc. Article 92 states remuneration policies should be enforced by competent authorities. Article 93 states institutions receiving government support should (a) strictly limit variable pay to ‘percentage of net revenue’ (b) set by competent authority, (c) and have no variable given pay to management ‘unless justified’. Article 95 says there must be a remuneration committee for all credit institutions, with non-executive directors. ‘If employee representation... is provided for by national law, the remuneration committee shall include one or more employee representatives.’ Lastly, article 96 requires a credit institution to maintain a website on governance and pay for the rules under articles 88–96.

Section III of Title VII concerns the supervisory review and evaluation process. Article 100 contains rules on the "annual stress test".

=== Titles VIII-XI, final provisions ===
Title VIII requires disclosure by competent authorities. Title IX concerns implementing acts. Title X concerns amendments. Title XI contains transitional and final provisions.

== See also ==
- EU law
- Banking law

== Notes ==
A consolidated text of the CID including any amendments can be found at https://eur-lex.europa.eu/legal-content/EN/TXT/?uri=CELEX:02013L0036-20180709.
