= Basic indicator approach =

The basic approach or basic indicator approach is a set of operational risk measurement techniques proposed under Basel II capital adequacy rules for banking institutions.

Basel II requires all banking institutions to set aside capital for operational risk. The basic indicator approach, however, is much simpler as compared to the alternative approaches (i.e. standardized approach (operational risk) and advanced measurement approach) and thus has been recommended for banks without significant international operations.

Based on the original Basel Accord, banks using the basic indicator approach must hold capital for operational risk equal to the average over the previous three years of a fixed percentage of positive annual gross income. Figures for any year in which annual gross income is negative or zero should be excluded from both the numerator and denominator when calculating the average. A standard deviation is commonly also taken.

The fixed percentage 'alpha' is typically 15 percent of annual gross income.

== See also ==
- Advanced measurement approach
- Basel II
- Operational risk
- Reputational risk
- Standardized approach (operational risk)
