= Strategic risk =

Strategic risk refers to the risks that can affect an organisation’s ability to achieve its long-term objectives and successfully deliver its strategic aims. These risks can develop from decisions made by the organisation itself, such as entering new markets or changing products and services, but can also result from external factors such as economic conditions, technological change and changes within the wider business environment.

Strategic risk management considers these risks as part of a wider strategy-setting process, rather than treating risk management as a separate activity. This can include considering risk when setting objectives, assessing alternative strategies and responding to changes that could affect organisational performance.

Strategic risk differs from risks arising primarily from day-to-day operations or financial activities because it is connected to an organisation’s strategic direction, the decisions made to achieve its objectives and changes in the environment in which it operates.

== Importance of strategic risk ==
The importance of strategic risk has risen along with both "regulatory and stakeholder expectations". In 2005, the Corporate Executive Board (CEB), now under Gartner, published a study of Fortune 1000 companies between the years 1998 and 2002, and the types of risks that affected them the most. These companies comprised the top 20% who faced the most drastic "market value declines", and the number one risk they had in common was strategic risk (the second and third being operational and financial risk, respectively).

Strategic risks may be contrasted with operational risks, such as production processes, data protection, and the employment and engagement of key members of staff. There are many possible kinds of strategic risk. For example, according to a different study by CEB, published 2010, companies whose cultures do not put a strong emphasis on integrity, have been found to be 10 times more likely to commit unethical acts than those who do. CEB's Dan Currell states that such a factor may seem obvious, but is difficult to enforce in reality. A firm must establish an environment in which employees feel comfortable in communicating with each other, both managers and subordinates alike. Not addressing the strategic risk—or simply changing one's corporate culture—is much more likely to incur compliance and other business risks. CEB's Matthew Dixon states several factors that are not wrong, but ineffective in today's most common customer service strategies—chiefly, the idea that a customer service worker should do everything they can to please the customer, or what many call "going the extra mile". Instead, Dixon claims a defensive approach, where the customer service worker is instead responsive, would be much less costly and require generally less resources, including "burn[ing] out" one's employees and improved concentration.

== Financial distress and strategic risk ==
In 2004, James Lam Associates researched the main cause for financial distress at companies that publicly traded. The research question was: when a company faces a major market value decline which is a 30 percent relative decline, what was the main cause? The research team found that 76 S&P 500 companies had suffered a dramatic decline in market value in a month, after analyzing the market value data of S&P 500 companies from 1982 to 2003. The JLA research team determined the root cause of their market value decline by reviewing news reports, regulatory filings, and company statements. These 76 companies worked with a cross major industries such as energy, materials, industrials, telecommunications, consumer products, health care, utilities, and financials. Overall, the JLA's study found that 61 percent of occurrences were due to strategic risks (i.e. consumer demand, M&A, competitive threats), 30 percent were caused by operational risks, and 9 percent were due to financial risks. Yet, in practice, a lot of Enterprise Risk Management (ERM) programs downplay or ignore strategic risks.

== Declines in market value ==
Deloitte & Touche LLP and Deloitte Research, a part of Deloitte Services LP, conducted research in 2005 and analyzed the major declines the shareholders experienced in market value. The Corporate Executive Board and James Lam & Associates research also did research on the same however they used different organizations and time frame.

Deloitte Research approached Thomson Financial Global 100 Companies from 1994 to 2003 to complete the research. Their discovery was astonishing as they noticed, compared to the Morgan Stanley Financial World Index, the stock price decrease just after one month.

The main conclusion to this research was that most of the companies that had large losses had more than one type of risk. Out of the 100 largest declines the most affected group was strategic risk management with an astonishing 66 companies involved.

The second largest decline involved 62 companies claim business decline due to external events. The third decline involved operational risk with 61 companies claiming operational risk. The last high percentage of risk would include 37 companies claiming financial risk. Most companies overall lacked intelligence to offer quick responses to developing problems.

Overall most companies failed to plan for high impact risks and meet customer needs, business and economic trends, and technology trends.

== Implementation and assessment methods ==
Implementation of the risk management plan requires the company to consider a couple of factors for the success and effectiveness of the risk management plan. First, the firm must assign responsibility to a risk manager or managers to ensure the management plan can be carried out and individuals risks owners are identified. This assignment gives individuals adequate authority and access to resources to ensure the success of the management plan. Therefore, the management team must set a clear outline of who is responsible and what areas of the strategic risks. Secondly, the company must remain committed to the plan in a broader sense. This commitment should include providing adequate financial and human resources for risk managers to carry out the plan's implementation.

The risk manager must be able to understand the evolving nature of the risk management plan and adjust the plan accordingly to reflect the changes in the phases or stages of a strategy. For example, a risk being addressed may not be as significant as previously thought; therefore, the management team should reflect such change in its plan and allocate resources from this risk to other ones. Also, certain risks addressed will or will not occur at a particular stage or phase of a project, and the management team should update such changes to keep the plan current. Keeping a current plan frees up resources to those risks identified as more current or severe. Certain risks might result in overspending or under, affecting the resources available for the management plan. Thus, the adequacy of the financial and human resources for the success of the risk management plan should be frequently reevaluated to give as much warning as possible for excess contingency or future inadequacy.

Assessment of the strategic risk must involve a cross-functional team that establish and maintain a review process for the company's new and current strategy. The cross-functional team should include representatives from key departments such as management, marketing, legal, operations, and technology. Assembling a cross-function team to assess strategic risk allows the company to obtain a dimensional perspective on its strategy, receiving different inputs to grasp the situation entirely. The assessment should establish objective criteria for each strategy. To assess a particular strategy, the team should also consider whether the risks being addressed may be derived from government policy, macroeconomics, natural, social industrialization and technological uncertainty. For instance, a cosmetic company that wants to upgrade its products overseas as a strategy to leverage its revolutionizing technology to gain comparative advantage must consider whether such technology complies with the local government or not.

== Mitigating strategic risk ==
Since strategic risk comes from the business strategy of a company, it is important for top management and the board of directors to be involved in creating a plan to reduce risk in this area. Management should use their knowledge of the company and its industry to formulate a strategy, and work in collaboration with the board of directors to identify and assess possible risks associated with that strategy. It is then the role of the board to decide upon an acceptable level of risk and whether the potential gains from the strategy proposed are worth the risk.

Three approaches to managing strategic risk include:

- Using independent experts
  - Experts from outside of the firm can be used to periodically assess the risk level of projects
- Facilitators
  - A central group manages risk across different departments of a company by collecting information from operating managers and creating a comprehensive review of the company's risk
- Embedded experts
  - In industries such as financial services where the company's level of risk is highly variable and dependent upon the actions of traders and investment managers, risk experts can work alongside these employees to continuously monitor and assess their daily actions

Strategic risk management framework

By following a strategic management process, a company can ensure that risk is addressed at every step of

- Strategic risk profile analysis
  - In this step, risks are identified by examining factors that could affect the business. These could be internal factors, such as the organization's structure and culture, or external factors such as industry trends, consumer preferences, or the regulatory environment the company is operating in. A SWOT analysis can be performed to evaluate and prioritize certain risks.
- Formulation of strategic plan
  - Using insight gained from the analysis, the company outlines proposed strategies and defines the objectives and goals needed to carry out its strategic mission/vision. The strategic plan should detail key risk metrics and performance indicators to measure, how they will be measured, and who is responsible for managing them. It should also establish thresholds, or trigger points for these metrics, which will be used to determine when management should take action to mitigate or accept more risk.
- Implementation
  - During this step, the company puts the strategy into practice through their operations. This includes setting budgets and the organizational structure. This is also where strategic risk is controlled and managed by monitoring the risk metrics identified during the analysis.
