= British Investment Bank =

The British Investment Bank was a proposed public bank designed to finance projects of national interest. All members of the G7 group of countries, plus Russia, have a public investment bank of varying kinds, except for Britain. It is seen as a useful route for small and medium businesses to get loans on fair terms, particularly when conventional private banks are reluctant to lend.

It was supported by Ed Balls and Chuka Umunna among others in the UK Labour Party in 2013.

== See also ==
- British Business Bank
- Nordic Investment Bank
- KfW
