= Asset quality =

Gem Festival

Asset quality is an evaluation of asset to measure the credit risk associated with it.

== Description ==
Asset quality is related to the left-hand side of the bank balance sheet. Bank managers are concerned with the quality of their loans since that provides earnings for the bank. Loan quality and asset quality are two terms with basically the same meaning.

Government bonds and T-bills are considered as good quality loans whereas junk bonds, corporate credits to low credit score firms etc. are bad quality loans. A bad quality loan has a higher probability of becoming a non-performing loan with no return.

Bank management components are:

1. Asset management
2. Liquidity management
3. Liability management
4. Capital adequacy management
5. Risk management

== See also ==
- Risk-weighted asset
- CAMELS ratings
- Bank condition
- Banking regulation
