= Capital Requirements Regulation 2013 =

EU banking law

Regulation 575/2013
- European Union regulation
- Text with EEA relevance
- Title: on prudential requirements for credit institutions and investment firms
- Made by: European Parliament and Council
- Made under: Article 114 of the TFEU.
- Journal reference: OJ L 176, 27.6.2013, p. 1–337

History
- Date made: 26 June 2013
- Implementation date: 27 June 2013
- Applies from: 1 January 2014, with the exception of: Article 8(3), Article 21 and Article 451(1), which shall apply from 1 January 2015; Article 413(1), which shall apply from 1 January 2016; the provisions of this Regulation that require the ESAs to submit to the Commission draft technical standards and the provisions of this Regulation that empower the Commission to adopt delegated acts or implementing acts, which shall apply from 31 December 2014.

Preparative texts
- EESC opinion: OJ C 68, 6.3.2012, p. 39.

Other legislation
- Replaces: Directive 2006/48/EC and Directive 2006/49/EC (among others)
- Amends: Regulation (EU) No 648/2012

Directive 2013/36/EU
- European Union directive
- Text with EEA relevance
- Title: on access to the activity of credit institutions and the prudential supervision of credit institutions and investment firms
- Made by: European Parliament and Council
- Made under: Article 53(1) of the TFEU.
- Journal reference: OJ L 176, 27.6.2013, p. 338–436

History
- Date made: 26 June 2013
- Implementation date: 18 July 2013
- Applies from: 31 December 2013

Preparative texts
- EESC opinion: OJ C 68, 6.3.2012, p. 39–44

Other legislation
- Replaces: Directive 2006/48/EC and Directive 2006/49/EC (among others)
- Amends: Directive 2002/87/EC
- Amended by: Directive 2014/17/EU and Directive 2014/59/EU

The Capital Requirements Regulation (EU) No. 575/2013 is an EU law that aims to decrease the likelihood that banks go insolvent. With the Credit Institutions Directive 2013 the Capital Requirements Regulation 2013 (CRR 2013) reflects Basel III rules on capital measurement and capital standards.

Previous rules were found in the Capital Requirements Directives (2006/48 and 2006/49). Together the new rules are sometimes referred to in the media as the “CRD IV” package. It applies from 1 January 2014. This is the third set of amendments to the original directives, following two earlier sets of revisions adopted by the Commission in 2008 (CRD II) and 2009 (CRD III).

== Rationale ==
The financial crisis has shown that losses in the financial sector can be extremely large when a downturn is preceded by a period of excessive credit growth. The financial crisis revealed vulnerabilities in the regulation and supervision of the banking system at European and global level. Institutions entered the crisis with capital of insufficient quantity and quality and, in order to safeguard financial stability, governments had to provide support to the banking sector in many countries.

== Contents ==
This package of regulation implement Basel III in the European Union. Despite the fact that the new rules respect the balance and level of ambition of Basel III, there are two reasons why Basel III cannot simply be copy/pasted into EU legislation and, therefore, a faithful implementation of the Basel III framework shall be assessed having regard to the substance of the rules. First, Basel III is not a law. It is the latest configuration of an evolving set of internationally agreed standards developed by supervisors and central banks. That has to now go through a process of democratic control as it is transposed into EU and national law. Furthermore, while the Basel capital adequacy agreements apply to 'internationally active banks', in the EU it has applied to all banks (more than 8,300) as well as investment firms. This wide scope is necessary in the EU since banks authorised in one Member State can provide their services across the EU's single market (known as 'EU banking passport') and as such are more than likely to engage in cross-border business.

Within this framework the previous CRD was divided into two legislative instruments: a directive governing the access to deposit-taking activities and a regulation establishing the prudential requirements institutions need to respect. While Member States have transposed the directive into national law, the regulation is directly applicable, which means that it creates law that takes immediate effect in all Member States in the same way as a national instrument, without any further action on the part of the national authorities. This removes the major sources of national divergences. It also makes the regulatory process faster and makes it easier to react to change market conditions. It increases transparency, as one rule as written in the regulation will apply across the single market. A regulation is subject to the same political decision making process as a directive at European level, ensuring full democratic control.

Directive (Strong links with national law, less prescriptive)	Regulation (Detailed and highly prescriptive provisions establishing a single rulebook)
Access to taking up/pursuit of business	Capital
Exercise of freedom of establishment and free movement of services	Liquidity
Prudential supervision	Leverage
Capital buffers	Counterparty credit risk
Corporate governance	Large exposures
Sanctions	Disclosure requirements (Pillar 3)

=== European addition to Basel III ===
In implementing the Basel III agreement within the EU, capital, liquidity and the leverage ratio were considered, covering the whole balance sheet of the banks. In addition to Basel III implementation, the package introduces a number of important changes to the banking regulatory framework. The following is added to the Directive:

- The remuneration framework has been further strengthened with regard to the requirements for the relationship between the variable (or bonus) component of remuneration and the fixed component (or salary) in order to tackle excessive risk taking. For performance from 1 January 2014 onwards, the variable component of the total remuneration shall not exceed 100% of the fixed component of the total remuneration of material risk takers. Exceptionally, and under certain conditions, shareholder can increase this maximum ratio to 200%.
- CRD IV strengthens the requirements with regard to corporate governance arrangements and processes and introduces new rules aimed at increasing the effectiveness of risk oversight by Boards, improving the status of the risk management function and ensuring effective monitoring by supervisors of risk governance.
- Diversity in board composition should contribute to effective risk oversight by boards, providing for a broader range of views and opinion and therefore avoiding the phenomenon of group think. CRD IV therefore introduces a number of requirements, in particular as regards gender balance.
- Enhanced transparency. CRD IV improves transparency regarding the activities of banks and investment funds in different countries, in particular as regards profits, taxes and subsidies in different jurisdictions. This is considered essential for regaining the trust of EU citizens in the financial sector.
- Systemic risk buffer
- Other systemic institution buffer

Finally, the new rules seek to reduce to the extent possible reliance by credit institutions on external credit ratings by requiring that all banks' investment decisions are based not only on ratings but also on their own internal credit opinion; and, that banks with a material number of exposures in a given portfolio develop internal ratings for that portfolio instead of relying on external ratings for the calculation of their capital requirements.

The main addition in the Regulation is the "Single Rulebook", which aims to provide a single set of harmonised prudential rules which institutions throughout the EU must respect. The term Single Rulebook was coined in 2009 by the European Council in order to refer to the aim of a unified regulatory framework for the EU financial sector that would complete the single market in financial services. This will ensure uniform application of Basel III in all Member States, it will close regulatory loopholes and will thus contribute to a more effective functioning of the Internal Market. The new rules remove a large number of national options and discretions from the CRD, and allow Member States to apply stricter requirements only where these are justified by national circumstances, needed on financial stability grounds or because of a bank's specific risk profile.

== Phase-in ==
The original Commission proposal followed the timeline as agreed in the Basel Committee and in the framework of the G20: application of the new legislation as from 1 January 2013, and full implementation on 1 January 2019, in line with the international commitments. Given the detailed discussions during trilogues and their impact on the length of the legislative process, the new legislation was published on 27 June 2013 and fully entered into force on 17 July 2013. Institutions were required to apply the new rules from 1 January 2014, with full implementation on 1 January 2019.

=== Capital phase-in ===
- CET1
- T1
- Total (with T2)
- Conservation buffer

== See also ==
- Credit Institutions Directive 2013
- Capital Requirements Directives, on previous laws
- Banking union
