= Basel I =

Banking requirements published in 1988

Basel I, or the 1988 Basel Accord, is a framework on banking regulations published by the Basel Committee on Banking Supervision in 1988. It arose from deliberations by central banks from major countries during the late 1970s and 1980s. By 1992, it had been transposed into law by all Group of Ten (G10) countries.

== Background ==
The motivation for an international accord on minimum capital requirements came primarily from the United States, where such minimums were first introduced in the early 1980s and where banks subject to them expressed concern about being undercut by then-rapidly expanding competitors from Japan. In March 1984, Federal Reserve chairman Paul Volcker advocated such an international standard in a presentation at the BCBS, but failed to gain traction. Instead, the Federal Reserve went for a bilateral approach and in early 1987 published an agreement with the Bank of England, which it then leveraged to stimulate the more multilateral discussion at the BCBS.

== Main framework ==
Basel I is primarily focused on credit risk and appropriate risk-weighting of assets. Assets of banks were classified and grouped in five categories according to credit risk, carrying risk weights of 0% (for example cash, bullion, home country debt like Treasuries), 20% (securitisations such as mortgage-backed securities (MBS) with the highest AAA rating), 50% (municipal revenue bonds, residential mortgages), 100% (for example, most corporate debt), and some assets given no rating. Banks with an international presence are required to hold capital equal to 8% of their risk-weighted assets (RWA).

The tier 1 capital ratio = tier 1 capital / all RWA

The total capital ratio = (tier 1 + tier 2 capital) / all RWA

Leverage ratio = total capital/average total assets

Banks are also required to report off-balance-sheet items such as letters of credit, unused commitments, and derivatives. These all factor into the risk weighted assets, which are reported to regulators. In the United States, the report is typically submitted to the Federal Reserve Bank as HC-R for the bank-holding company and submitted to the Office of the Comptroller of the Currency (OCC) as RC-R for just the bank.

From 1988 this framework was progressively introduced in member countries of G-10, comprising 13 countries as of 2013: Belgium, Canada, France, Germany, Italy, Japan, Luxembourg, Netherlands, Spain, Sweden, Switzerland, United Kingdom and the United States.

Over 100 other countries also adopted, at least in name, the principles prescribed under Basel I. The efficacy with which the principles are enforced varies, even within nations of the Group.

== Shortcomings ==
Basel I incentivized global banks to lend to members of the OECD and the IMF's General Arrangements to Borrow (GAB) while disincentivizing loans to non-members of these institutions.
