= Joint Forum =

The Joint Forum (previously known as The Joint Forum on Financial Conglomerates) is an international group bringing together financial regulatory representatives from banking, insurance and securities. It works under the international bodies for these sectors, the Basel Committee on Banking Supervision (BCBS), the International Organization of Securities Commissions (IOSCO) and the International Association of Insurance Supervisors (IAIS). The group develops guidance, principles and identifies best practices that are of common interest to all three sectors.

It was initially set up in response to an increasing number of large financial organisations providing services in all three sectors across multiple countries. Today the Forum deals with issues that are common to all three sectors, including financial regulation of conglomerates.

== History ==
The Joint Forum was established in 1996, from a suggestion of the Basel Committee on Banking Supervision (Basel Committee) to take forward the work of the Tripartite Group whose report was released in July 1995. The Joint Forum can trace its origins from the Tripartite Group which was formed in early 1993 to address a range of issues relating to the supervision of financial conglomerates. The Tripartite group was composed of bank, securities and insurance supervisors and looked at issues related to the supervision of large financial conglomerates.

== Structure and Membership ==
The Joint Forum is a group of technical experts and is composed of an equal number of senior bank, insurance and securities supervisors.

Thirteen countries are represented in the Joint Forum: Australia, Belgium, Canada, Denmark, France, Germany, Italy, Japan, Netherlands, Spain, Switzerland, United Kingdom and United States. The EU Commission attends in an observer capacity. The Chairmanship of the Joint Forum rotates between the three sector committees and is named for a two-year term.

A number of countries have integrated financial regulatory authorities where one organisation covers all financial regulation, including banking, insurance and securities. In these cases this national agency is typically a member of all three international organisations and a combined Joint Forum is a natural fit with the way they operate at a national level.

=== Chairs ===
- Thomas Schmitz-Lippert, Bundesanstalt für Finanzdienstleistungsaufsicht (BaFin), Germany (2012–present)
- Therese M. Vaughan, National Association of Insurance Commissioners, United States (January–November 2012)
- Tony D'Aloisio, Chief Executive, Australian Securities and Investments Commission (January 2010)
- John C. Dugan, Comptroller of the Currency, United States (October 2007–December 2009)
- Dirk Witteveen, de Nederlandsche Bank (2006-September 2007)
- Ian Johnston, Hong Kong Securities and Futures Commission (June-December 2005)
- Gay Huey Evans, UK Financial Services Authority (2004-June 2005)
- José María Roldán, Bank of Spain (2002–2003)
- Jarl Symreng, Finansinspektionen - Sweden (2000–2001)
- Alan Cameron, Australian Securities and Investments Commission (1998–1999)
- Tom de Swaan, de Nederlandsche Bank (1996–1997)

== See also ==
- Bank regulation
- Financial regulation
- Securities commission
- List of financial supervisory authorities by country
