= Terri Vaughan =

Therese Michele "Terri" Vaughan (born June 12, 1956) is an American insurance academic, regulator, and advisor. She was insurance commissioner of the state of Iowa for 10 years from 1994 to 2005, and was the CEO of the National Association of Insurance Commissioners (NAIC) for four years from February 2009 to December 2012. She is currently executive in residence at Drake University, having previously been its Robb B. Kelley distinguished professor of insurance and actuarial science, Dean of its College of Business and Public Administration, and director of its Insurance Center.

== Early life and education ==
Vaughan was born in 1956 in Blair, Nebraska. Her father was insurance scholar, academic, and author Emmett J. Vaughan (1934-2004).

She received a BBA in Insurance and Economics from the University of Iowa in 1979. In 1985 she received a PhD in Managerial Science, Applied Economics, and Risk and Insurance from the University of Pennsylvania.

She holds the professional insurance designations: Associate, Society of Actuaries (ASA); Chartered Property and Casualty Underwriter (CPCU); Associate, Casualty Actuarial Society (ACAS); and Member, American Academy of Actuaries (MAAA).

== Career ==
Vaughan was an adjunct assistant professor of insurance at Temple University from January 1983 to December 1985, CBPA Dean Terri Vaughan named key influencer in the insurance industry and an assistant professor of economics and finance at Baruch College from January 1986 to May 1987.

From May 1987 to July 1988 she was a consultant at the actuarial firm Tillinghast, in its risk management and casualty division.

In August 1988 she was appointed the director of The Insurance Center at Drake University, a position she held through July 1994. She was an assistant professor from 1988 to 1994, and chair of the insurance department from 1990 to 1994.

In August 1994, she was appointed Insurance Commissioner of the state of Iowa. She was Iowa's longest-serving insurance commissioner, serving through both Democratic and Republican state administrations, resigning in December 2004 after 10 years.

She also served as president of the National Association of Insurance Commissioners (NAIC) for the year 2002, having been its secretary-treasurer and its vice president in previous years and serving as chair of several NAIC committees. As president, she led a number of key initiatives, including the development of the NAIC's response to the 9/11 attacks, and the creation of an interstate compact for the filing of life insurance and annuity products.

In January 2005 Vaughan re-joined the faculty of Drake University, as the Robb B. Kelley distinguished professor of insurance and actuarial science.

She was president of the American Risk and Insurance Association 2008–2009, having previously been vice president and program chair, and having been on its board of directors since 2003.

In February 2009, leaving academia again, she was appointed CEO of the NAIC, a post she held through November 2012. She pushed for state regulators' rights in the face of the federal government's Patient Protection and Affordable Care Act and Dodd-Frank Act. She worked both nationally and internationally, and focused particularly on financial and solvency matters.

In 2016 Best's Review credited her with having "helped steer the organization through the recovery years after the Great Recession, helping identify, develop, prioritize, and achieve regulatory modernization and other key initiatives" during her tenure as CEO.

She also served as a member of the executive committee of the International Association of Insurance Supervisors. In 2012 she was chair of the Joint Forum, the international forum of banking, insurance, and securities regulators.

In June 2014 she returned to academia, as Dean of Drake University's College of Business and Public Administration through June 2017. She was subsequently appointed Robb B. Kelley visiting distinguished professor of insurance and actuarial science at Drake. and in 2019 she was made Executive in Residence at the university.

Vaughan is on the board of directors of Verisk Analytics, is chair of its nominating and corporate governance committee, and is also on its compensation committee and executive committee. She is also on the boards of directors of Wellmark Blue Cross Blue Shield, AIG, and West Bancorporation.

== Books ==
Vaughan co-authored, with her father Emmett J. Vaughan, the college textbook Essentials of Insurance (1995), and since his 2004 death she has continued to revise, expand, and update his college textbook Fundamentals of Risk and Insurance.

== Recognition ==
In 1996 Vaughan received a Distinguished Alumni Award from the University of Iowa. In 2003 she was inducted into the Iowa Insurance Hall of Fame. In 2011 she was ranked #10 in the Modern Healthcare list of the 100 Most Influential People in Healthcare. In 2012 she was listed in National Underwriter magazine's Top 25 Living Legends of Insurance. In 2013 she was named a Distinguished Fellow of the International Association of Insurance Supervisors.

She was among the Top 50 Women in the Insurance Industry in a 2014 listing by Reactions magazine, and in 2014 she was also named Insurance Woman of the Year by the Association of Professional Insurance Women (APIW). In 2016 she was named one of 24 Key Influencers in the insurance industry by Best's Review.
