= Liquidity regulation =

Liquidity regulations are financial regulations designed to ensure that financial institutions (e.g. banks) have the necessary assets on hand in order to prevent liquidity disruptions due to changing market conditions. This is often related to reserve requirement and capital requirement but focuses on the specific liquidity risk of assets that are held.

These regulations were imposed to negate liquidity risks of banks that played a prominent role in financial crises. Financial banks profit from providing liquidity and maturity transformation, which is the practice by financial institutions of borrowing money on shorter timeframes than they lend money out. In other words, using shorter-term deposits to fund longer-term loans. This can lead to bank runs during which depositors demand repayment of their demandable and maturing deposits, before the borrowers are required to repay the loans. The result could be a liquidity crisis, which refers to an acute shortage (or "drying up") of liquidity.

== History ==
In response to liquidity risks, bank regulators agreed global standards to reduce banks' ability to engage in liquidity and maturity transformation, thereby reducing banks' exposure to runs. Traditionally, the response to this risk was a combination of deposit insurance and discount window access. The former assures depositors not to worry about insolvency, which presumably keeps depositors who thought they might lose their funds entirely, out of the withdrawal line. The latter assures banks have access to short-term liquidity in order to meet the demands of depositors who have an immediate need for cash. These previous regulations were mainly to guard against moral hazard that both programs could create. Over the decades, after the implementation of these regulations, relatively few liquidity problems occurred in the deposit-funded commercial banking system.

=== Response to the 2008 financial crisis ===
Over time there was a vast increase in the creation of so-called cash equivalent instruments, which were supposedly safe, short-term, and liquid, but eventually resulted in poorly underwritten subprime mortgages - a classic adverse feedback loop ensued. This led to the fall of the housing market and the 2008 financial crisis. In response to this failure of liquidity regulations, there has been recent progress in developing new measures to further reinforce the core role of liquidity regulation.

In 2010, the UK Financial Services Authority (FSA) introduced a new liquidity regulation known as the Individual Liquidity Guidance (ILG).

In 2013, the Basel Committee on Banking Supervision agreed on a Liquidity Coverage Ratio (LCR), which is similar in design to the ILG but plays a role in an international playing field. The purpose of ILG is to make the banking system more resilient to liquidity shocks by requiring banks to hold a minimum quantity of "high quality liquid assets" (HQLA). These HQLA consist of cash, central bank reserves and government bonds to cover net outflows of liabilities under two specific stress scenarios, lasting 14 days and 3 months respectively. This way it is assumed that banks that are more heavily dependent on short-term wholesale funding, especially from foreign counterparts, would experience greater funding outflows and therefore need to hold a higher ratio of HQLA to total assets, to ensure immediate survival in stressed funding conditions.

The U.S. banking agencies have worked with other regulators in the Basel Committee on Banking Supervision to develop the Net Stable Funding Ratio (NSFR), which is the available amount of stable funding, relative to the required amount of stable funding. It is assumed that this ratio should be at least 100% on an on-going basis. The ratio can be calculated with the following formula:

$\frac{Available \ amount \ of \ stable \ funding}{Required \ amount \ of \ stable \ funding}$ ≥ 100%

In this case, the ‘available stable funding’ is defined as the portion of capital and liabilities expected to be reliable over the time horizon considered by the NSFR, which extends to one year. The amount of such ‘stable funding required’ of a specific institution is a function of the liquidity characteristics and residual maturities of the various assets held by that institution, and those of its off-balance sheet exposures. In short, the NSFR will require banks to maintain a stable funding profile in relation to the composition of their assets and off-balance sheet activities.

Together, the LCR and NSFR are designed to mitigate the risks associated with banks' reliance on unstable funding structures and to encourage them to embrace more resilient funding models. The difference between the two is that the LCR is specifically designed to improve the short-term resilience of banks against liquidity shocks and the NSFR, on the other hand, is designed to limit the risks emanating from excessive maturity mismatches over the medium to long term

== Debate ==
There is some debate on the impact of the LCR and NSFR, since they can at most constrain maturity mismatches within the banking system. The underlying economic core reasons why money suppliers want liquid funds and borrowers want longer-term loans are not changed by these regulations. It is therefore a matter of time until alternative methods of liquidity and maturity transformation will be developed that may result in the next financial crisis. Whether the outcome of these liquidity regulations is a net positive for financial stability is debatable. For further reading on the debatable effects of these liquidity regulations see;

== See also ==
- Basel Accords
- Bank regulation
- Stress test (financial)
