= Fernando Restoy =

Spanish financial services policymaker

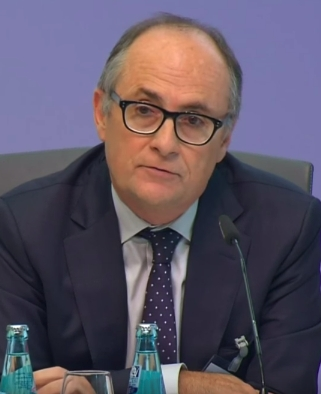
- Restoy in 2017

Chairman of the Financial Stability Institute
- Incumbent
- Assumed office 1 January 2017
- Preceded by: Josef Tošovský

Vice Governor of the Bank of Spain
- In office 18 June 2012 – 31 December 2016
- President: Luis María Linde
- Preceded by: Javier Aríztegui
- Succeeded by: Javier Alonso Ruiz-Ojeda

Vice Chairman of Comisión Nacional del Mercado de Valores
- In office 6 October 2008 – 18 June 2012
- President: Julio Segura Sánchez
- Preceded by: Carlos Arenillas
- Succeeded by: Lourdes Centeno

Personal details
- Born: September 4, 1961 (age 63); Madrid, Spain
- Education: Complutense University of Madrid, London School of Economics, Harvard University

Fernando Restoy Lozano (born 1961 in Madrid) is a Spanish economist who has been the Chairman of the Financial Stability Institute of the Bank for International Settlements since early 2017. In his previous position he was Vice Governor of the Bank of Spain from 2012 to 2017, and in parallel Chairman of Fondo de Reestructuración Ordenada Bancaria from 2012 to 2015.

== Education ==
Restoy graduated in Economics from Complutense University of Madrid in 1984, winning the premio extraordinario for his class. In 1988 he received a Master in Econometrics and Mathematical Economy with mark of distinction from the London School of Economics. He received a Ph.D. in Economics from Harvard University in 1991.

== Career ==
In 1991 he joined the Bank of Spain, where he served in the Research Department until 2007. In the 1990s he simultaneously taught economics at Complutense University and Charles III University of Madrid. He became head of the research Department in 2001, and coauthored publications in the following years on Spain's real estate market.

In July 2007 he became a Commissioner of the Comisión Nacional del Mercado de Valores (CNMV), the Spanish securities market regulator. On 1 January 2008 he also became chairman of CESR-Fin, a group of the Committee of European Securities Regulators (which in 2011 was superseded by the European Securities and Markets Authority). He became the CNMV's Vice Chairman in October 2008.

In June 2012, Restoy returned to the Bank of Spain as Vice Governor. In this capacity he also became Chairman of the Fondo de Reestructuración Ordenada Bancaria (FROB) in the wake of the Spanish Memorandum of Understanding on financial assistance. His successor at the FROB has been Jaime Ponce.

On 1 January 2017 he became the chairman of the Financial Stability Institute of the Bank for International Settlements (BIS) in Basel, succeeding Josef Tošovský who had been in that position since 2000.

== See also ==
- European Banking union
