= International Organization of Securities Commissions =

International financial regulatory body

International Organisation of Securities Commissions
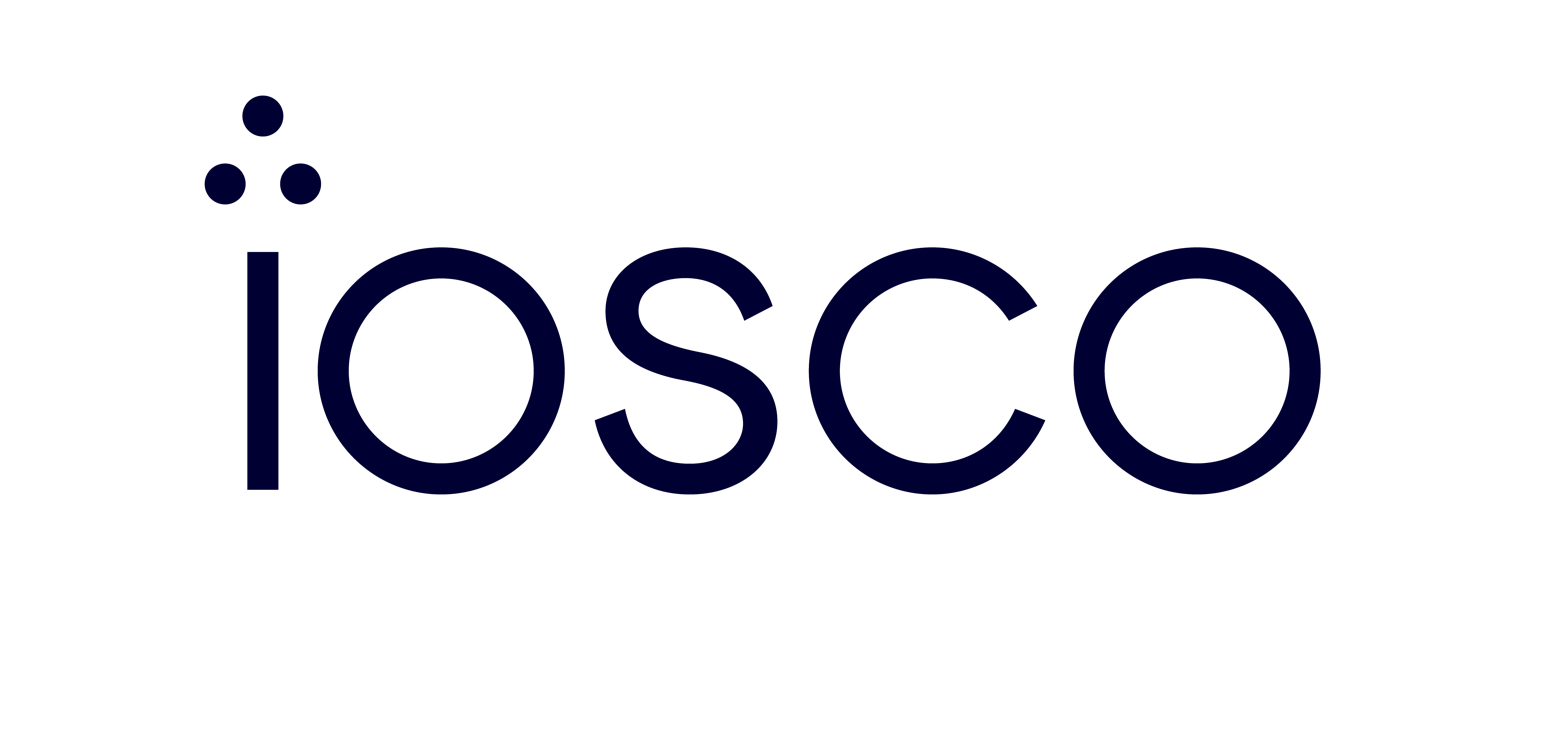
- Abbreviation: IOSCO
- Formation: April 1983; 43 years ago
- Type: International organisation
- Headquarters: Madrid, Spain
- Members: 240 (August 2024)
- Official language: English, French, Spanish, Portuguese, Arabic
- Secretary General: Rodrigo Buenaventura
- Revenue: €6,044,426 (2022)
- Staff: 28
- Website: iosco.org

The International Organization of Securities Commissions (IOSCO) is an association of organizations that regulate the world's securities and futures markets. Members are typically primary securities and/or futures regulators in a national jurisdiction or the main financial regulator from each country. Its mandate is to:

- Develop, implement, and promote high standards of regulation to enhance investor protection and reduce systemic risk
- Share information with exchanges and assist them with technical and operational issues
- Establish standards toward monitoring global investment transactions across borders and markets

IOSCO has members from over 100 countries, who regulate more than 95% of the world's securities markets. It has a permanent secretariat in Madrid, Spain.

== History ==
IOSCO was born in 1983 from the transformation of its ancestor the "Inter-American Regional Association" (created in 1974) into a truly global cooperative. This decision to expand the organization beyond the Americas was made at the annual gathered in Quito, Ecuador, in April 1983. At the same time, the organization was renamed to IOSCO to reflect the expanded membership beyond North and South America. Securities regulators from France, Indonesia, South Korea, and the United Kingdom were the first agencies to join from outside the Americas. The IOSCO July 1986 Paris Annual Conference was the first to take place outside of the American continents and on that occasion a decision was made to create a permanent General Secretariat for the Organization. One remnant of its early inter-American roots is that IOSCO's "official" languages are English, French, Spanish, and Portuguese.

In 1998 IOSCO started work on a number of important policies that led to broader set of guidelines. However it was the September 11, 2001 attacks as well as a series of large global financial scandals that started with Enron and including Worldcom, Parmalat, and Vivendi that brought urgency to this work and heralded IOSCO's evolution from an international "talk shop", where little of substance was accomplished, to a serious international organization with a real impact on the securities regulation. At the 1999 conference in Lisbon, it was decided to have a permanent headquarters for the administrative General Secretariat and that it should be based in Madrid.

In 2002 IOSCO adopted a multilateral memorandum of understanding (IOSCO MMoU) designed to facilitate crossborder enforcement and exchange of information among the international community of securities regulators. Then in 2005 IOSCO MMoU become the benchmark for international cooperation among securities regulators.

== Membership ==
As of August 2024, IOSCO had 240 members. IOSCO members are divided into three main categories:

- Ordinary members: primary securities and/or futures markets regulators in a jurisdiction. A stock exchange or self-regulatory organization may be an ordinary member, but only if it is the jurisdiction's primary securities regulator. Each ordinary member has one vote.
- Associate members: other securities and/or futures regulators in cases where there's more than one per jurisdiction. For example, the Commodity Futures Trading Commission (CFTC) and the North American Securities Administrators Association in the United States are associate members of IOSCO given that the U.S. Securities and Exchange Commission is the ordinary member from the United States. Associate members have no vote and are not eligible for the Executive Committee; they are, however, members of the Presidents' Committee.
- Affiliate members: include stock exchanges, self-regulatory organizations, and various stock market industry associations. Affiliate members have no vote, are not eligible for the Executive Committee, and are not members of the Presidents' Committee. Affiliate members that are self-regulatory organizations (SROs), are, however, members of the SRO Consultative Committee.

== Structure ==
The organization is made up of a number of committees that meet several times a year at locations around the world supported by a permanent administrative General Secretariat.

Administratively, IOSCO is run by a General Secretariat based in Madrid, Spain. The IOSCO Board is IOSCO's governing and standard-setting body. It is composed of 35 securities regulators; Jean-Paul Servais, Chairman of the Financial Services and Markets Authority, is the chair of the IOSCO Board. He is supported by three vice chairs: Dr. Mohamed Farid Saleh, Executive Chairman, Financial Regulatory Authority, Egypt; Shigeru Ariizumi, Vice Minister for International Affairs, Financial Services Agency, Japan; and Rostin Behnam, Chairman, Commodity Futures Trading Commission, United States of America.

=== Regional committees ===
The Growth and Emerging Markets (GEM) Committee is the largest Committee within IOSCO and represents more than 75 percent of the IOSCO membership, including ten of the G20 members. Dr Mohamed Farid Saleh, Executive Chairman of the Financial Regulatory Authority, Egypt, is Chair of the GEM Committee.

The GEM Committee comprises 92 members and 25 non-voting associate members who include the world's fastest-growing economies. Emerging economies are expected to represent a growing portion of IOSCO membership as new members continue to join. IOSCO is the only international standard setter that has a committee solely responsible for emerging market issues. This inclusiveness increases IOSCO's effectiveness and positions it to play a bigger part in shaping the global regulatory framework: The GEM has been allocated a seat on the IFRS Foundation Monitoring Board.

IOSCO counts four regional committees: Africa / Middle-East (AMERC) chaired by Ms. Nezha Hayat, Chairperson and CEO of the Moroccan Autorité Marocaine du Marché des Capitaux, Asia & Pacific (APRC) chaired by Ms. Julia Leung Chief Executive Officer of the Hong-Kong Securities and Futures Commission, European Regional Committee (ERC) chaired by Mr. Jean-Paul Servais Chairman of Belgium’s Financial Services and Markets Authority, and Inter-American Regional Committee (IARC) chaired by Ms. Lucia Buenrostro Vice President of Regulatory Policy at the Mexican Comisión Nacional Bancaria y de Valores.

== External cooperation ==
IOSCO is a member of, participates as an observer in, or coordinates with a number of other organizations. One of its most important relationships is with the Joint Forum of international financial regulators. IOSCO, along with the Basel Committee on Banking Supervision and the International Association of Insurance Supervisors, make up the Joint Forum.

The IOSCO MOUs are considered the primary instruments to facilitate cross border cooperation, reduce global systemic risk, protect investors, and ensure fair and efficient securities markets.

Additionally, IOSCO is a member of, participates as an observer in, or coordinates with a number of other international organizations, including the OECD, FSB, Financial Action Task Force on Money Laundering, IASB, PIOB, IMF, World Bank, and European Commission.

== Policies ==
IOSCO adopted in 1998 a comprehensive set of Objectives and Principles of Securities Regulation (IOSCO Principles). These continue to be developed and expanded. IOSCO recommends all its members to adopt these and helps its members assess the level of compliance with the principles. These include;

- Regulatory principles designed to improve auditor independence and auditor oversight
- Regulatory principles for corporate financial disclosure and transparency
- Regulatory principles regarding conflicts of interest for financial analysts
- A code of conduct for credit rating agencies
- A set of "core principles" for securities regulation designed to outline for IOSCO members what makes up "good" securities regulation
- A multilateral memorandum of understanding on enforcement co-operation, through which IOSCO members pledge to provide each other with collecting information and witness statements in an enforcement investigation

== Leadership ==
Secretary-General of IOSCO:

- Paul Guy, 1987 - 1994
- Eudald Canadell, 1995 - 1998
- Peter B. Clark, 1998 - 2001
- Philippe Richard, 2001 - 2007
- Greg Tanzer, January 2008 - January 2012
- David Wright, March 2012 - March 2016
- Paul Andrews, March 2016 - December 2020
- Martin Moloney, September 2021 - August 2024
- Tajinder Singh (acting), August-December 2024
- Rodrigo Buenaventura, since January 2025

== See also ==
- CPSS-IOSCO Principles for Financial Market Infrastructures
- Financial regulation
- International Centre for Financial Regulation
- List of financial supervisory authorities by country
- Securities commission
