= CPSS-IOSCO Principles for Financial Market Infrastructures =

The CPSS-IOSCO Principles for Financial Market Infrastructures (PFMIs) are a set of principles to manage market risk that were published in 2012 by the Committee on Payment and Settlement Systems of the Bank for International Settlements and the Technical Committee of the International Organization of Securities Commissions.

It sets out twenty-four principles to be followed to manage market risk in financial market infrastructure.

In the United Kingdom, the regulator for payment systems, central securities depositories and central counterparties, the Bank of England, requires the operator comply with the CPSS-IOSCO principles.

== Principles ==
=== General organisation ===
==== Principle 1: Legal basis ====
The operations of the system must have a clear basis in the law of the jurisdictions it operates in. This is important to avoid the uncertainty that would result if there was the possibility that the courts might void or hold-up transactions.

==== Principle 2: Governance ====
Market governance arrangements must be clear and transparent. They should support the stability of the market and take account of the wider public interest.

==== Principle 3: Framework for the comprehensive management of risks ====
The market operator must have a proper risk management framework.

=== Credit and liquidity risk management ===
==== Principle 4: Credit risk ====
The market operator must carefully manage its credit exposure to market participants, and have sufficient resources to cover any credit risk it is exposed to.

==== Principle 5: Collateral ====
If the market requires collateral, it must choose collateral with low credit, liquidity and market risks.

==== Principle 6: Margin ====
Central counterparties must manage their credit exposure to market participants by ensuring they have an effective margin system.

==== Principle 7: Liquidity risk ====
The market operator must monitor and manage liquidity risk.

=== Settlement ===
==== Principle 8: Settlement finality ====
Liabilities incurred must be settled with finality, at the very least at the end of the day where value is credited, but ideally in real-time.

==== Principle 9: Money settlements ====
The system should settle in central bank money wherever possible. Credit risk and liquidity risk must be minimised.

==== Principle 10: Physical deliveries ====
If the market deals with securities or commodities, there must be clear rules about their physical delivery.

Risks relating to the storage and delivery of physical securities and commodities must be managed.

=== Central securities depositories and exchange-of-value settlement systems ===
==== Principle 11: Central securities depositories ====
Where a securities depository holds the underlying securities of a market it must manage this 'safeguarding' risk, and ensure the securities are held separately from its own assets.

==== Principle 12: Exchange-of-value settlement systems ====
Where two linked obligations are exchanged in a transaction (for example, foreign exchange), the settlement of one must be conditional on the settlement of the other.

=== Default management ===
==== Principle 13: Participant-default rules and procedures ====
The market needs to have rules to cope with the default of a market participant, ensuring the losses are contained and liquidity preserved to allow the market to continue to operate.

==== Principle 14: Segregation and portability ====
For a central counterparty, it must be possible to segregate and move the positions of the participants' customers.

=== General business and operational risk management ===
==== Principle 15: General business risk ====
The market operator must manage its own business risks to ensure it can continue as a going concern. It must maintain a reserve to ensure it can be wound down in an orderly fashion if the need arises.

==== Principle 16: Custody and investment risks ====
Assets, whether belonging to the market operator or market participants, must be safeguarded against losses. Any investments must be chosen for minimal credit, liquidity and market risks.

==== Principle 17: Operational risk ====
A financial market must identify operational risks: both internally and across the market and its participants. Where appropriate, they should mitigate the risks through controls.

Systems used by the market must have a high degree of reliability and security, and must have sufficient capacity for the needs of the market.

Business continuity must be in place to recover from disruption.

=== Access ===
==== Principle 18: Access and participation requirements ====
Criteria for participating in the market must be objective and transparent, ensuring fair and open access.

==== Principle 19: Tiered participation arrangements ====
Where the financial market has participants at different tiers (i.e. direct participants, and indirect participants who are themselves serviced by the direct participants) then the market operator needs to monitor and manage the risks that such indirect relationships could cause.

==== Principle 20: FMI links ====
If a financial market infrastructure (FMI) is interlinked to another FMI then it needs to monitor and manage the risks relating to that relationship.

=== Efficiency ===
==== Principle 21: Efficiency and effectiveness ====
Financial markets should be structured to efficiently and effectively meet the needs they were created to serve.

==== Principle 22: Communication procedures and standards ====
The market should use relevant and internationally accepted methods of communicating transactions.

=== Transparency ===
==== Principle 23: Disclosure of rules, key procedures, and market data ====
The rules and procedures of the financial market must be clear. Participants must have sufficient information to enable them to understand the risks that they take by participating in the market, and the costs of doing so.

Rules and key procedures must be disclosed publicly.

==== Principle 24: Disclosure of market data by trade repositories ====
A trade repository must disclose relevant market information to the public and government authorities that is timely and accurate.
