= Financial Stability Institute =

- Abbreviation: FSI
- Formation: 1999; 27 years ago
- Founder: Bank of International Settlements and Basel Committee on Banking Supervision
- Founded at: Basel, Switzerland
- Purpose: Co-ordination between national banks and financial regulators
- Location: Basel, Switzerland
- Region served: Worldwide
- Products: Co-ordination between national financial regulators, Publishing papers on the financial system
- Parent organization: Bank of International Settlements
- Website: www.bis.org/fsi

The Financial Stability Institute (FSI) is one of the bodies hosted by the Bank of International Settlements (BIS) at its headquarters in Basel, Switzerland.

== Purpose ==
Established in 1999 by the BIS and the Basel Committee on Banking Supervision, its primary role is to improve the co-ordination between national banks regulators through holding seminars and acting as a clearing house for information on regulatory practice.

== History ==
The FSI was set up in response to the East Asian financial crisis of 1997, as the result of a perceived weakness in co-ordination between national regulators in matters of training and general understanding of financial systems. As a result, its work is concentrated in the regulators of the non-G-10 nations.

== Chairmans ==
- Josef Tosovský, 1 December 2000 – 31 December 2016.
- Fernando Restoy, 1 January 2017– present.

== Publications ==
The FSI has released 11 occasional papers, of which two have detailed the expectations of the various global regulators regarding Basel II implementation in their jurisdictions.

== See also ==
- Fund governance
- Financial crisis
- Financial Stability Board
- Macroprudential regulation
- Systemic risk
