= Disaggregated sovereignty =

Disaggregated sovereignty refers to the need for broad strategic cooperation on critical issues requiring the ceding of sovereignty from several sovereign entities to new institutions without creating a centralized authority or "government." Some people argue that this is the de facto situation of global governance and actually more desirable than the creation of a single world government.

The idea was first invoked in 2004 by the political theorist Anne-Marie Slaughter in her 2004 book, A New World Order, which discussed the numerous, interwoven networks of national officials working together across borders on a variety of issues and threats, such as the coalition of nations that came together after the September 11 terrorist attacks, the G8 and G20, and the environmental agencies of the US, Canada, and Mexico working within the NAFTA framework to create an environmental enforcement network. Slaughter provides other examples such as judges of one nation citing decisions from other countries in areas such as free speech, privacy rights, and bankruptcy.

A common and imperfect analogy is often made to the European Union as an example of how states can cede sovereignty to create regional governance. Traditional concepts of sovereignty emphasize separation into territorially independent groups. Disaggregated sovereignty focuses on the mutual obligation and positive capacity to participate collectively through multiple institutions to address global and regional problems. Criticisms of the idea of disaggregated sovereignty note that an international legal patchwork creates a larger area for states to manipulate the balances of freedoms and responsibilities, particularly in regards to mass surveillance. The expansion of international law, instead, challenges the rule of law by creating so many overlapping laws that responsibilities can be shifted and disavowed.
