= Committee on the Global Financial System =

International financial body

The Committee on the Global Financial System (CGFS) is an international body hosted by the Bank for International Settlements (BIS) in Basel.

== Overview ==
The Euro-Currency Standing Committee (ECSC) was established by a decision of the BIS Governors at their meeting of April 1971. It adopted its current name in February 1999, as the word euro had taken a new meaning as the European single currency.

The CGFS reports to the BIS Global Economy Meeting. It helps member central banks to assess stability risks in financial markets on a global scale, and coordinates the ongoing development of the BIS's international banking and financial market statistics. It has been described by economist Charles Goodhart as the "premier macro-economic forum for the discussion of international tensions / imbalances".

As of 2024, the CGFS had 28 members: Central Bank of Argentina, Reserve Bank of Australia, National Bank of Belgium, Central Bank of Brazil, Bank of Canada, People's Bank of China, European Central Bank, Bank of France, Deutsche Bundesbank, Hong Kong Monetary Authority, Reserve Bank of India, Bank of Italy, Bank of Japan, Bank of Korea, Central Bank of Luxembourg, Bank of Mexico, De Nederlandsche Bank, Central Bank of Russia, Saudi Central Bank, Monetary Authority of Singapore, South African Reserve Bank, Bank of Spain, Sveriges Riksbank, Swiss National Bank, Bank of Thailand, Bank of England, Board of Governors of the Federal Reserve System, and Federal Reserve Bank of New York.

== Chairs ==
- René Larre, 1971-1979
- Alexandre Lamfalussy, 1980-1993
- Andrew Crockett, 1994-1996
- Toshihiko Fukui, 1996-1998
- Yutaka Yamaguchi, 1998-2003
- Roger W. Ferguson Jr., 2003-2006
- Donald Kohn, 2006-2010
- Mark Carney, 2010-2012
- William C. Dudley, 2012-2018
- Philip Lowe, 2018-2023
- Rhee Chang-yong, since November 2023

== See also ==
- Committee on Payments and Market Infrastructures
