= International Association of Insurance Supervisors =

- Abbreviation: IAIS
- Formation: 1994; 32 years ago
- Type: Swiss association
- Headquarters: Centralbahnplatz 2, Basel, Switzerland
- Chair of the Executive Committee: Toshiyuki Miyoshi, Financial Services Agency of Japan
- Secretary General: Gerry Cross
- Affiliations: Bank for International Settlements
- Website: iais.org

The International Association of Insurance Supervisors (IAIS) is a voluntary membership organization of insurance supervisors from more than 200 jurisdictions, constituting 97% of the world's insurance premiums. It is the international standard-setting body for the insurance sector.

The IAIS' mission is to promote effective and globally consistent supervision of the insurance industry in order to develop and maintain fair, safe and stable insurance markets for the benefit and protection of policyholders and to contribute to the maintenance of global financial stability.

The IAIS is responsible for developing principles, standards and other supporting material for the supervision of the insurance sector and assisting in their implementation. The IAIS also provides an international forum for members to share their experiences and understanding of insurance supervisions and insurance markets.

The IAIS coordinates its work with other international financial policymakers and associations of supervisor or regulators to support global financial stability while also bringing the insurance supervisory perspective to cross-sectoral issues in alignment with key international bodies.

The IAIS was established in 1994 and operates as a verein, a type of non-profit organisation under Swiss Civil Law.

== Structure ==
The IAIS' activities are supported by its secretariat and headed by a secretary general. The IAIS is hosted by the Bank for International Settlements (BIS).

The IAIS coordinates it work with BIS-hosted committees such as the Basel Committee on Banking Supervision (BCBS) and other BIS-hosted entities such as the Financial Stability Board (FSB) and the Financial Stability Institute (FSI).

=== Committees ===
The IAIS delivers on its mission through a committee system made up of its members. The committee system is led by an Executive Committee whose 38 members come from different regions of the world, representing advanced and developing insurance markets.

The Executive Committee is responsible for providing strategic direction and managing IAIS affairs as specified by its by-laws. It appoints the secretary general and takes all essential decisions for advancing the IAIS mission in accordance with the resolutions of the General Meeting of Members.

The Executive Committee is supported by the following five committees:

1. Audit and Risk Committee;
2. Budget Committee;
3. Implementation Assessment Committee;
4. Monitoring and Risk Assessment Committee; and
5. Standards and Supervisory Practices Committee.

IAIS projects and activities are carried out by various subcommittees and forums.

== Activities ==
Guided by its strategic plan, the IAIS develops a two-year roadmap setting out the specific projects that the IAIS will undertake over the next two years. Projects and activities contained within the roadmap can be broadly divided into the following categories:

1. Financial stability: The IAIS has a role in the identification, assessment and mitigation of systemic risk in the insurance sector. Activities in the area of financial stability include monitoring global insurance market trends and developments and detecting the possible build-up of systemic risk in the global insurance sector, as well as analysing and developing IAIS supervisory and supporting material on issues related to financial stability, systemic risk and macroprudential supervision. It assists its Members in developing enhanced macroprudential surveillance tools.
2. Standard setting: The IAIS develops supervisory material (principles, standards and guidance) for effective supervision of insurance-related activities. Notably, the IAIS has developed the Insurance Core Principles (ICPs) and the Common Framework for the Supervision of Internationally Active Insurance Groups (ComFrame). The ICPs provide the globally accepted standards for supervision of the insurance sector. ComFrame builds on the ICPs and establishes supervisory standards and guidance focusing on the effective group-wide supervision of Internationally Active Insurance Groups (IAIGs). In December 2024, the IAIS adopted the first comprehensive global capital standard for insurance supervision, the Insurance Capital Standard (ICS), providing a risk-based measure of capital adequacy for internationally active insurance groups (IAIGs).
3. Supporting supervisory practices and facilitating capacity building: The IAIS supports insurance supervisors in implementing its standards. The IAIS achieves this by facilitating the exchange of information and sharing good supervisory practices among insurance supervisors. The IAIS also develops various supporting material to supplement its supervisory material and provide additional background on specific areas of interest to insurance supervisors. The IAIS also promotes supervisory capacity-building initiatives to address gaps and challenges in the implementation of the IAIS supervisory material. The IAIS works closely with key implementation partners such as the Access to Insurance Initiative (A2ii), the Financial Stability Institute (FSI), the International Association of Actuaries (IAA), the UN-convened Sustainable Insurance Forum (SIF) and the Toronto Centre, as well as international organisations and regional associations of supervisors. Working closely with international organisations and regional groups of supervisors, it also supports training seminars and conferences, as well as initiatives to support financial inclusion.
4. Implementation assessment: The IAIS actively promotes the implementation of its supervisory material by conducting assessments and peer reviews of observance of supervisory material, consistent with the Financial Sector Assessment Program (FSAP) conducted by the International Monetary Fund (IMF) and the World Bank. The IAIS’ implementation program includes peer reviews, member assessments, targeted jurisdictional assessments (used for Holistic Framework implementation assessments) and a self-assessments tool.

=== Meetings and events ===
The IAIS holds committee meetings and subcommittee meetings to progress its work, which are open to its members (insurance supervisors) only.

The IAIS also hosts public events. It hosts a virtual Global Seminar offering insurance supervisors and stakeholders an opportunity to discuss current and globally significant matters impacting the insurance sector, as well as the IAIS' most recent activities. It also holds an in-person Annual Conference which is open to supervisors and stakeholders to discuss topical issues and progress on IAIS activities. In conjunction with this conference, it convenes an Annual General Meeting of members where it conducts official business.

Throughout the year, the IAIS also organises a range of other stakeholder engagements, including by organising webinars to introduce new consultations, or by convening with CROs to discuss the risks impacting the insurance sector.

== Publications ==
The IAIS regularly publishes supporting guidance in the form of Application Papers, Issues Papers, Notes and Reports Recently published papers have covered a wide range of topics, including sustainability and climate risk, corporate governance, fair treatment of customers, cyber risk, FinTech and protection gaps.

IAIS financial stability activities are supported by an annual publication of the Global Insurance Market Report (GIMAR). The GIMAR highlights the outcomes of the Global Monitoring Exercise (GME), which assesses global insurance market trends and developments and detects the possible build-up of systemic risk in the global insurance sector. It also includes the outcomes of an annual survey on the global reinsurance market. At mid-year, the IAIS publishes a summary of the interim outcomes of the GME ahead of the publication of the final GIMAR at the end of the year.

The IAIS publishes a monthly newsletter outlining recent and upcoming news and activities, a Year in Review which presents the highlights of each calendar year and the Roadmap which sets out the IAIS’ annual work programme.

== See also ==
- Insurance law
- Bank regulation
- Financial regulation
