= Advanced IRB =

Credit risk measurement techniques

The term Advanced IRB or A-IRB is an abbreviation of advanced internal ratings-based approach, and it refers to a set of credit risk measurement techniques proposed under Basel II capital adequacy rules for banking institutions.

Under this approach the banks are allowed to develop their own empirical model to quantify required capital for credit risk. Banks can use this approach only subject to approval from their local regulators.

Under A-IRB banks are supposed to use their own quantitative models to estimate PD (probability of default), EAD (exposure at default), LGD (loss given default) and other parameters required for calculating the RWA (risk-weighted asset). Then total required capital is calculated as a fixed percentage of the estimated RWA.

Reforms to the internal ratings-based approach to credit risk are due to be introduced under the Basel III: Finalising post-crisis reforms.

== Some formulae in internal-ratings-based approach ==
Some credit assessments in standardised approach refer to unrated assessment. Basel II also encourages banks to initiate internal ratings-based approach for measuring credit risks. Banks are expected to be more capable of adopting more sophisticated techniques in credit risk management.

Banks can determine their own estimation for some components of risk measure: the probability of default (PD), loss given default (LGD), exposure at default (EAD) and effective maturity (M). For public companies, default probabilities are commonly estimated using either the "structural model" of credit risk proposed by Robert Merton (1974) or reduced form models like the Jarrow–Turnbull model. For retail and unlisted company exposures, default probabilities are estimated using credit scoring or logistic regression, both of which are closely linked to the reduced form approach.

The goal is to define risk weights by determining the cut-off points between and within areas of the expected loss (EL) and the unexpected loss (UL), where the regulatory capital should be held, in the probability of default. Then, the risk weights for individual exposures are calculated based on the function provided by Basel II.

Below are the formulae for some banks' major products: corporate, small-medium enterprise (SME), residential mortgage and qualifying revolving retail exposure. S being Min(Max(Sales Turnover,5),50 )

In the formulas below,

- N(x) denotes the normal cumulative distribution function
- G(z) denotes the inverse cumulative distribution function
- PD is the probability of default
- LGD is the loss given default
- EAD is the exposure at default
- M is the effective maturity

=== Corporate exposure ===
The exposure for corporate loans is calculated as follows

==== Correlation ====
$$R = AVC \cdot \Bigl(0.12 \cdot \frac{1 - e^{-50 \cdot PD}}{1 - e^{-50}} + 0.24 \cdot \left(1- \frac{1 - e^{-50 \cdot  PD}}{1 - e^{-50}}\right)\Biggr)$$
AVC (Asset Value Correlation) was introduced by the Basel III Framework, and is applied as following:
- $AVC = 1.25$ if the company is a large regulated financial institution (total asset equal or greater to US $100 billion) or an unregulated financial institution regardless of size
- $AVC = 1$ else

==== Maturity adjustment ====
$$b= (0.11852 - 0.05478 \cdot \ln(PD))^2$$

==== Capital requirement ====
$$K= LGD \cdot \left[N\left(\sqrt{\frac{1}{1-R}} \cdot G(PD) +\sqrt{\frac{R}{1-R}} \cdot G(0.999)\right) - PD \right] \cdot \frac{1+(M-2.5) b}{1-1.5 b}$$

==== Risk-weighted assets ====
$$RWA  = K \cdot 12.5 \cdot EAD$$

=== Corporate exposure adjustment for SME ===
For small and medium enterprises with annual Sales Turnover below 50 million euro, the correlation may be adjusted as follows:

==== Correlation ====
$$R = 0.12 \cdot \frac{1 - e^{-50 \cdot PD}}{1 - e^{-50}} + 0.24 \cdot \left(1- \frac{1 - e^{-50 \cdot PD}}{1 - e^{-50}}\right)  - 0.04 \cdot (1-\frac{\max(S-5,0)}{45})$$

In the above formula, S is the enterprise's annual sales turnover in millions of euro.

=== Residential mortgage exposure ===
The exposure related to residential mortgages can be calculated as this

==== Correlation ====
$$R = 0.15$$

==== Capital Requirement ====
$$K=LGD \cdot \left[N\left(\sqrt{\frac{1}{1-R}} \cdot G(PD) +\sqrt{\frac{R}{1-R}}\cdot G(0.999)\right) -  PD\right]$$

==== Risk-weighted assets ====
$$RWA = K \cdot 12.5 \cdot EAD$$

=== Qualifying revolving retail exposure (credit card product) ===
The exposure related to unsecured retail credit products can be calculated as follows:

==== Correlation ====
$$R = 0.04$$

==== Capital Requirement ====
$$K=LGD \cdot \left[N\left(\sqrt{\frac{1}{1-R}} \cdot G(PD) +\sqrt{\frac{R}{1-R}}\cdot G(0.999)\right) -  PD\right]$$

==== Risk-weighted assets ====
$$RWA = K \cdot 12.5 \cdot EAD$$

=== Other retail exposure ===
All other retail exposures are calculated as follows:

==== Correlation ====
$R = 0.03 \frac{(1-e^{-35\cdot PD})}{(1-e^{-35})} + 0.16 \left(1-\frac{(1-e^{-35\cdot PD})}{(1-e^{-35})}\right)$

==== Capital Requirement ====
$$K=LGD \cdot \left[N\left(\sqrt{\frac{1}{1-R}} \cdot G(PD) +\sqrt{\frac{R}{1-R}}\cdot G(0.999)\right) -  PD\right]$$

==== Risk-weighted assets ====
$$RWA = K \cdot 12.5 \cdot EAD$$

== The advantages ==
- Basel-II benefits customers with lower probability of default.
- Basel-II benefits banks to hold lower capital requirement as having corporate customers with lower probability of default (Graph 1).

- Basel-II benefits SME customers to be treated differently from corporates.
- Basel-II benefits banks to hold lower capital requirement as having credit card product customers with lower probability of default (Graph 2).
