= Kamakura Corporation =

- Type: Closely held private company
- Industry: Software
- Founded: 1990; 36 years ago
- Headquarters: Honolulu, United States
- Key people: Prof. Robert A. Jarrow (Director of Research)
- Owner: Dr Donald R. van Deventer
- Website: www.kamakuraco.com

Kamakura Corporation is a global financial software company headquartered in Honolulu, Hawaii. It specializes in software and data for risk management for banking, insurance and investment businesses.

The company was founded in 1990 by its current CEO and Chairman Dr. Donald R. van Deventer, and as of 2019 Kamakura had served more than 330 clients in 47 countries. Cornell professor Robert A. Jarrow, co-creator of the Heath–Jarrow–Morton framework for pricing interest rate derivatives and the reduced form Jarrow–Turnbull credit risk models employed for pricing credit derivatives, serve as the company's Director of Research.

In June 2022, Kamakura was acquired by SAS Institute.

== History ==
Kamakura Corporation was founded in Tokyo in 1990. Kamakura Risk Manager (KRM) was first sold commercially in 1993. It was the first credit model published with random interest rates and the first stochastic interest rate term structure model-based valuation software. In 1995, they hired Robert A. Jarrow as their Director of Research. The first closed-form non-maturity deposit valuation model was implemented in KRM in 1996. TD Bank started using KRM during that year.

Kamakura relocated to Honolulu and qualified for the State research and development subsidy. Jarrow-Lando-Turnbull published Markov model for the term structure of credit began to spread in 1997. The stochastic multi-period net income simulation was added to KRM in 1998.

The first implementation of a reduced form credit risk model was made in 2000. Kamakura was the first vendor to offer integrated credit and market risk in their risk management products. In 2002, they launched the KRIS default probability service for 20,000 listed firms. They completed their first Basel II client implementation in 2003. Insurer MetLife and pension fund Ontario Teachers' Pension Plan became clients during that year. Pair-wise default correlations were added to KRIS in 2004. Implied Ratings and Implied CDS Spreads were added to KRIS in 2006. KRIS-CDO launched in 2007. In 2008, Kamakura was named one of the top three worldwide financial information vendors in a Risk Technology 2008 survey. They launched a Basel II-compliant default probability service for sovereigns in 2008 as well. They were named the world's number 1 asset and liability management vendor and number 1 liquidity risk vendor in a Risk Technology 2009 survey. In 2009 the U.S. Office of the Comptroller of the Currency signed for KRIS public firm default models, KRIS sovereign default models and KRIS credit portfolio manager. In 2017, Hong Leong Finance signed with Kamakura Corporation's risk management software. Kamakura was named for the second consecutive year to the World Finance 100 in 2018, and released version 10 of the Kamakura Risk Manager in March of that year.

== Products and services ==
The company has two primary products. Kamakura Risk Manager (KRM), an enterprise risk management system integrating credit risk management including IFRS 9 and CECL, market risk management, asset liability management, Basel II and Basel III and other capital allocation technologies, transfer pricing, and performance measurement. Kamakura Risk Information Services (KRIS) is a risk portal providing data for quantitative credit risk measures such as default probabilities, bond spreads, implied spreads and implied ratings for corporate, sovereign and bank counterparties. It also allows users to stress portfolios through Macro Factor Sensitivities and Portfolio Management tools. The Kamakura Troubled Company index measures the percentage of 39,000 public firms in 76 countries that have an annualized one-month default risk of over one percent. In January 2018, the company released its Troubled Bank Index.

== Awards ==
- 2018 Kamakura Corporation was recognized as a Category Leader in Credit by Chartis Research in its report "Technology Solutions for Credit Risk 2.0 2018"
- World Finance 100 2017, 2016, 2012 *Credit Technology Innovation Awards 2010 winner: Thomson Reuters (Kamakura default probability service)
- Credit Technology Innovation Awards 2010 winner: Fiserv (Kamakura Risk Manager)

== Publications ==
- Advanced Financial Risk Management: Tools and Techniques for Integrated Credit Risk and Interest Rate Risk Management, 2nd Edition, Wiley & Sons, 2013, ISBN 978-1-118-27854-3
- Advanced Financial Risk Management: Tools and Techniques for Integrated Credit Risk and Interest Rate Risk Management, 1st Edition, Wiley & Sons, 2005, ISBN 978-0-470-82126-8
- Asset and Liability Management: A Synthesis of New Methodologies, RISK Books, 1998, ISBN 1-899-332-76-6
- Financial Risk Analytics: A Term Structure Model Approach for Banking, Insurance & Investment Management, 1997, IRWIN Professional Publishing, ISBN 0-7863-0964-4
- Risk Management in Banking: The Theory & Application of Asset & Liability Management, 1993, McGraw-Hill, ISBN 1-55738-353-7
