= Numerix =

American capital markets analytics and risk technology company

Numerix LLC
- Type: Limited liability company
- Industry: Financial technology; Risk management software
- Founded: 1996; 30 years ago
- Founder: Alexander Sokol; Nigel Goldenfeld; Mitchell Feigenbaum; Michael Goodkin
- Headquarters: New York City, New York, United States
- Area served: Worldwide
- Key people: Emanuele Conti (President and CEO)
- Products: Numerix Oneview; Numerix CrossAsset; Numerix NxCore; PolyPaths; Kynex; FINCAD Analytics Suite
- Owner: Genstar Capital (2022–present)
- Website: numerix.com

Numerix is an American capital markets analytics and risk management technology company headquartered in New York City. It develops pricing, risk management, and portfolio analytics software for financial derivatives, structured products, fixed income securities, and convertible securities, serving sell-side institutions including banks and broker-dealers, and buy-side participants including asset managers, insurance companies, and hedge funds.

The company's platform ecosystem spans derivatives pricing and XVA analytics through Numerix Oneview and CrossAsset, fixed income and asset-liability management through PolyPaths, convertible securities analytics through Kynex, and cross-asset quantitative analytics libraries through the FINCAD Analytics Suite and NxCore. Its software supports regulatory capital calculations including SA-CCR, FRTB, and ISDA SIMM (initial margin), as well as counterparty credit risk, real-time market risk, and structured product valuation across rates, FX, equity, credit, commodities, inflation, and hybrid instruments.

Numerix was ranked #14 in the Chartis RiskTech100® 2026, an annual independent ranking of the world's leading risk and compliance technology providers, and received category awards for Front Office Risk Management and XVA for two consecutive years.

== History ==
=== Founding and early development ===
Numerix was founded in 1996 in New York City by Alexander Sokol, Nigel Goldenfeld, Mitchell Feigenbaum, and Michael Goodkin as a quantitative software company developing multi-asset class pricing toolkits for OTC derivative instruments. The founders brought expertise from computational physics and quantitative finance, applying Monte Carlo simulation and numerical methods to derivative pricing at a time when such capabilities were largely confined to proprietary in-house systems at major banks.

Greg Whitten, a former chief software architect at Microsoft and early investor in the company, made a significant additional investment of US$32 million in 2001, enabling Numerix to expand its platform and grow its client base among sell-side institutions globally.

Numerix CrossAsset, the company's foundational pricing and risk analytics library, became one of the financial industry's most widely used independent derivatives pricing engines, offering model coverage across fixed income and rates, equity, FX, credit, commodities, inflation, longevity, volatility, and hybrid instruments.

=== Oneview platform ===
In 2016, Numerix introduced Oneview, a real-time front and middle office risk management platform built on a microservices architecture. Oneview integrates pre-trade pricing, post-trade valuation, XVA calculations, counterparty credit risk (CCR), market risk, margin, and regulatory capital analytics within a single platform. It supports Python integration, cloud-native and hybrid deployment, and is designed for use by banks, asset managers, and trading desks requiring enterprise-scale risk computation across complex, multi-asset portfolios.

Oneview for XVA won the Risk Markets Technology Award for XVA Calculation Product of the Year in 2023. Numerix Oneview was named Best Sell-Side Market Risk Product at the WatersTechnology Sell-Side Technology Awards in 2023, and Best Market Risk Solution Provider in the WatersTechnology 2025 Waters Rankings. Numerix Oneview was also named Best Risk Management Platform in the 2023 FinTech Breakthrough Awards.

=== Acquisition by Genstar Capital ===
In August 2022, Numerix was acquired by Genstar Capital, a San Francisco-based private equity firm.

=== Emanuele Conti appointed CEO ===
In May 2023, Emanuele Conti was appointed President and CEO of Numerix, succeeding Steven O'Hanlon, who had served as CEO since January 2013 and became Vice Chairman. Conti previously held executive leadership roles at Opus Global, Kroll, and Dun & Bradstreet.

=== Acquisitions (2023–2026) ===
In April 2023, Numerix acquired FINCAD, a Vancouver, Canada-based analytics company specializing in the pricing and risk analytics of financial derivatives and fixed-income products, from Zafin. FINCAD's analytics suite extended Numerix's fixed income and multi-asset derivatives coverage for buy-side institutions.

In August 2023, Numerix acquired PolyPaths, a provider of analytics and risk management solutions for fixed income and structured finance. PolyPaths provides portfolio analytics, scenario analysis, and asset-liability management (ALM) capabilities covering bonds, structured notes, mortgages, mortgage servicing rights (MSRs), asset-backed securities, and derivatives. The acquisition extended Numerix's reach from the trading book into the banking book, enabling ALM analytics for banks and insurance companies.

In October 2024, Numerix acquired Kynex, a New Jersey-based financial platform founded in 1999 and specializing in convertible securities valuation, portfolio and risk management, and trade flow and order management. Kynex serves investment banks, asset managers, hedge funds, and broker-dealers in the convertible bond and hybrid securities market.

In October 2026, Numerix acquired Suite LLC, a New York-based financial analytics firm specializing in fixed‑income and derivatives pricing, risk management, and quantitative software solutions. The firm's flagship product, ALib™, provides industry‑grade pricing and risk management tools for derivatives and fixed income.

== Products ==
=== Numerix Oneview ===
Numerix Oneview is the company's flagship cross-asset, front-to-risk platform for derivative pricing, portfolio management, XVA analytics, counterparty credit risk, and enterprise market risk. It is built on a cloud-native microservices architecture and supports real-time risk computation, intraday profit and loss (P&L) attribution, scenario analysis, stress testing, and regulatory capital calculations including SA-CCR, FRTB, and ISDA SIMM. Oneview supports Python integration and is deployable on public cloud infrastructure including Amazon Web Services and Microsoft Azure.

=== NxCore ===
NxCore is Numerix's cloud-native quantitative analytics infrastructure platform, providing API access to the company's pricing and risk libraries for capital markets application development and analytics delivery. It comprises three components:

NxCore Analytics Services (NAS) is a cloud-based analytics API delivering high-performance pricing and risk analytics across multiple asset classes, including OTC derivatives, structured finance, fixed income, and XVA calculations. NAS operates on a SOC 2 Type 2 certified infrastructure with end-to-end encryption and a transparent, non-black-box architecture that documents how analytics are calculated. It is designed for institutions seeking to integrate Numerix's analytics engine into existing systems and workflows without managing on-premises infrastructure.

NxCore Workspaces is a cloud-native capital markets development platform providing an integrated development environment (IDE) for quantitative analysts and developers building, testing, and deploying financial models and applications. It integrates Numerix's analytics libraries with market data access, automated testing, batch scaling, and containerized cloud deployment. NxCore won Best Cloud-Native Computing Platform at the FTF News Technology Innovation Awards 2025.

NxCore Python (NxCP) is a Python-native SDK providing developer access to Numerix's analytics libraries with support for deployment across cloud platforms, customer data centers, and desktop environments.

=== Numerix CrossAsset ===
Numerix CrossAsset is a cross-asset derivatives pricing and risk analytics library offering one of the financial industry's most comprehensive collections of quantitative models for fixed income and rates, equity, FX, credit, commodities, inflation, longevity, volatility, and hybrid instruments. CrossAsset is used by financial institutions for pre-trade pricing, trade valuation, counterparty risk exposure measurement, market risk analytics, stress testing, scenario generation, and regulatory capital calculations.

=== PolyPaths ===
PolyPaths is a fixed income and structured finance analytics platform providing portfolio risk assessment, pre-trade analysis, asset-liability management, hedge analysis, and value at risk calculations. It covers a broad range of fixed income instruments including bonds, structured notes, mortgages, MSRs, loans, asset-backed structured products, non-maturity deposits, and interest rate derivatives. PolyPaths ALM integrates accounting and income simulation with market value risk analytics for banking book management.

=== Kynex ===
Kynex is an analytics and risk management platform for convertible securities, providing new issue pricing, individual security analytics for convertible bonds and corporate instruments, portfolio and risk management for multi-strategy portfolios, and trade flow and order management. It serves investment banks, asset managers, hedge funds, and broker-dealers active in the convertible and high-yield markets.

=== FINCAD Analytics Suite ===
The FINCAD Analytics Suite provides derivatives and fixed income pricing and risk analytics accessible via Microsoft Excel add-in and software development kits (SDKs) supporting multiple programming languages. It offers over 2,000 functions and more than 200 workbooks covering mark-to-market valuations, risk analysis, curve construction and validation, and fixed income evaluation for buy-side and sell-side institutions.

== Recognition ==
Numerix has received industry recognition across multiple independent evaluations:

- Chartis Quantitative Analytics50 2026: Ranked #1 overall; Category Awards for OTC Derivatives, Equity Derivatives, XVA, CVA, MVA, and OTC Derivatives Pricing
- Chartis RiskTech100® 2026: Ranked #14 overall; Category Awards for Front Office Risk Management, XVA, OTC Derivatives, and Equity Derivatives
- Chartis BuySideRisk50 2025: Ranked #5 overall; Category Awards for Cross-Context Analytics, Structured Note Analytics, and RMBS Analytics
- Risk Awards 2025: Technology Vendor of the Year; Counterparty Risk Product of the Year (Numerix Oneview for XVA)
- GlobalCapital Derivatives Awards 2025: Pricing and Valuation Provider of the Year; Risk Management Provider of the Year
- GlobalCapital Americas Derivatives Awards 2024: Global Pricing and Valuation Provider of the Year
- WatersTechnology Buy-Side Technology Awards 2025: Best Buy-Side Risk Management Product
- WatersTechnology Sell-Side Technology Awards 2023: Best Sell-Side Market Risk Product
- WatersTechnology Waters Rankings 2025: Best Market Risk Solution Provider
- Risk Markets Technology Awards 2024: Counterparty Risk Product of the Year (Numerix Oneview for XVA)
- Risk Markets Technology Awards 2023: XVA Calculation Product of the Year
- Asian Private Banker Technology Awards 2024: Best Risk Solution (fifth consecutive year); Most Innovative Solution (second consecutive year)
- FTF News Technology Innovation Awards 2025: Best Cloud-Native Computing Platform (NxCore)
- FTF News Technology Innovation Awards 2024: Best Cutting-Edge Solution (Numerix Oneview)
- FinTech Breakthrough Awards 2023: Best Risk Management Platform (Numerix Oneview)
- Risk.net Cloud Solution Provider of the Year 2022

== Clients and partners ==
Numerix's software is used by approximately 700 clients across more than 26 countries, including investment banks, asset managers, insurance companies, hedge funds, and regional banks. Partners include MathWorks, Broadridge Financial Solutions, Nomura Research Institute, Oracle Corporation, ICE Data Services, Microsoft, and Amazon Web Services.

== See also ==
- Financial risk management
- Derivatives
- Structured product
- Fixed income
- Convertible bond
- XVA
- Counterparty credit risk
- Asset-liability management
- FRTB
- SA-CCR
- ISDA SIMM
- Monte Carlo methods in finance
