= CCF =

CCF can refer to:

== Computing ==
- Confidential Consortium Framework, a free and open-source blockchain infrastructure framework developed by Microsoft
- Customer Care Framework, a Microsoft product

== Finance ==
- Credit conversion factor converts the amount of a free credit line and other off-balance-sheet transactions to its credit exposure equivalent, i.e. an Exposure at default
- Common contractual fund, an Irish collective investment scheme
- Crédit Commercial de France, a defunct French bank, now part of HSBC

== Health care ==
- Congestive cardiac failure

== Organizations ==
- Cambodian Children's Fund, a charity organization
- Center for Consumer Freedom, a food industry advocacy group
- Cheetah Conservation Fund, a Namibian wildlife conservation organization
- China Carbon Forum, a non-profit organization promoting climate change stakeholder dialogue
- China-CELAC Forum, a multilateral cooperation mechanism between China and CELAC
- China Computer Federation, Chinese association for computing professionals
- Combined Cadet Force, British-government sponsored organization for youth military training
- Cosmic Circle of Fellowship, UFO religion

== Politics ==
- Conservative Christian Fellowship, an organization allied with the British Conservative Party
- Conservative Collegiate Forum, the United Kingdom Conservative party's student organization from 1986 to 1998
- Co-operative Commonwealth Federation, Canadian political party from 1932 to 1961

== Sport ==
- Cyprus Cycling Federation, a Cypriot bicycling organization

== Transport ==
- Canadian Car and Foundry, a Canadian manufacturer of rail cars and buses
- CCF, IATA code for Carcassonne Salvaza Airport in France

== Other ==
- Cartoon Cartoon Fridays, a former programming block from Cartoon Network
- Centum cubic feet (100 cubic feet), an American standard unit of measurement for the volume of water or natural gas, sometimes capitalized as "Ccf" (from the Roman numeral for 100, C; see also Therm)
- Christ's Commission Fellowship, a non-denominational evangelical Christian church based in the Philippines
- Concentrated Complete Fertiliser, a product of Imperial Chemical Industries (ICI); see History of fertilizer
- Concentric crater fill, a geologic feature observed in impact craters on Mars
- Congress for Cultural Freedom, an anti-Communist advocacy group, dissolved in 1979
- Corpus Carminum Færoensium, a collection of Faroese folk ballads
