= Credit valuation adjustment =

Economics term

CVA related concepts:
- The mathematical concept as defined below;
- A part of the regulatory Capital and RWA (risk-weighted asset) calculation introduced under Basel III;
- The CVA internal department of an investment bank, whose purpose is to:
  - hedge for possible losses due to counterparty default;
  - hedge to reduce the amount of capital required under the CVA calculation of Basel III;
- The "CVA charge". The hedging of the CVA desk has a cost associated to it, i.e. the bank has to buy the hedging instrument. This cost is then allocated to each business line of an investment bank (usually as a contra revenue). This allocated cost is called the "CVA Charge".

A Credit valuation adjustment (CVA), (Note: A good introduction can be found in a paper by Michael Pykhtin and Steven Zhu. Karlsson et al. (2016) present a numerical efficient method for calculating expected exposure, potential future exposure and CVA for interest rate derivatives, in particular Bermudan swaptions.) in financial mathematics, is an "adjustment" to a derivative's price, as charged by a bank to a counterparty to compensate it for taking on the credit risk of that counterparty during the life of the transaction. "CVA" can refer more generally to several related concepts, as delineated aside. The most common transactions attracting CVA involve interest rate derivatives, foreign exchange derivatives, and combinations thereof. CVA has a specific capital charge under Basel III, and may also result in earnings volatility under IFRS 13, and is therefore managed by a specialized desk. CVA is one of a family of related valuation adjustments, collectively xVA; for further context here see Financial economics § Derivative pricing.

== Calculation ==
In financial mathematics one defines CVA as the difference between the risk-free portfolio value and the true portfolio value that takes into account the possibility of a counterparty's default. In other words, CVA is the market value of counterparty credit risk. This price adjustment will depend on counterparty credit spreads as well as on the market risk factors that drive derivatives' values and, therefore, exposure. It is typically calculated under a simulation framework. (Which can become computationally intensive; see (Note: According to the Basel Committee on Banking Supervision's July 2015 consultation document regarding CVA calculations, if CVA is calculated using 100 timesteps with 10,000 scenarios per timestep, 1 million simulations are required to compute the value of CVA. Calculating CVA risk would require 250 daily market risk scenarios over the 12-month stress period. CVA has to be calculated for each market risk scenario, resulting in 250 million simulations. These calculations have to be repeated across 6 risk types and 5 liquidity horizons, resulting in potentially 8.75 billion simulations.).)

=== Risk-neutral expectation ===
Unilateral CVA is given by the risk-neutral expectation of the discounted loss. The risk-neutral expectation can be written as

$$\mathrm{CVA(T)} = E^Q[L^*] = \int_0^T E^Q\left[\left.LGD\frac{B_0}{B_t} E(t)\;\right|\;t=\tau\right] d\mathrm{PD}(0,t)$$

where $T$ is the maturity of the longest transaction in the portfolio, $B_t$ is the future value of one unit of the base currency invested today at the prevailing interest rate for maturity $t$, $LGD$ is the loss given default, $\tau$ is the time of default, $E(t)$ is the exposure at time $t$, and $\mathrm{PD}(s,t)$ is the risk neutral probability of counterparty default between times $s$ and $t$. These probabilities can be obtained from the term structure of credit default swap (CDS) spreads.

=== Exposure, independent of counterparty default ===
Assuming independence between exposure and counterparty's credit quality greatly simplifies the analysis. Under this assumption this simplifies to

$$\mathrm{CVA} = LGD \int_0^T \mathrm{EE}^*(t)~d\mathrm{PD}(0,t)$$

where $\mathrm{EE}^*$ is the risk-neutral discounted expected exposure (EE):

$$\mathrm{EE}^*(t) = \mathbb{E}\left\lbrack{\frac{B_0}{B_t}~E(t)}\right\rbrack$$

=== Approximation ===
The full calculation of CVA, as above, is via a Monte-Carlo simulation on all risk factors; this is computationally demanding. There exists a simple approximation for CVA, sometimes referred to as the "net current exposure method". This consists in: buying default protection, typically a credit default swap, netted for each counterparty; and the CDS price may then be used to back out the CVA charge.

=== Accounting treatment ===
The CVA charge may be seen as an accounting adjustment made to reserve a portion of profits on uncollateralized financial derivatives. These reserved profits can be viewed as the net present value of the credit risk embedded in the transaction. Thus, as outlined, under IFRS 13 changes in counterparty risk will result in earnings volatility; see XVA § Accounting impact and next section.

== Function of the CVA desk ==
In the course of trading and investing, Tier 1 investment banks generate counterparty EPE and ENE (expected positive/negative exposure). Whereas historically, this exposure was a concern of both the front office trading desk and middle office finance teams, increasingly CVA pricing and hedging is under the "ownership" of a centralized CVA lending and treasury desk.

In particular, this desk addresses volatility in earnings due to the abovementioned IFRS 13 accounting standard requiring that CVA be considered in mark-to-market accounting. The hedging here focuses on addressing changes to the counterparty's credit worthiness, offsetting potential future exposure at a given quantile. Further, since under Basel III, banks are required to hold specific regulatory capital on the net CVA-risk, the CVA desk is responsible also for managing (minimizing) the capital requirements under Basel.

== See also ==
- Financial derivative
- Potential future exposure
- XVA
- Expected loss
