= Foundation IRB =

Credit risk measurement techniques

The term Foundation IRB or F-IRB is an abbreviation of foundation internal ratings-based approach, and it refers to a set of credit risk measurement techniques proposed under Basel II capital adequacy rules for banking institutions.

Under this approach the banks are allowed to develop their own empirical model to estimate the PD (probability of default) for individual clients or groups of clients. Banks can use this approach only subject to approval from their local regulators.

Under F-IRB banks are required to use regulator's prescribed LGD (Loss Given Default) and other parameters required for calculating the RWA (Risk-Weighted Asset) for non-retail portfolios. For retail exposures banks are required to use their own estimates of the IRB parameters (PD, LGD, CCF). Then total required capital is calculated as a fixed percentage of the estimated RWA.

Reforms to the internal ratings-based approach to credit risk are due to be introduced under the Basel III: Finalising post-crisis reforms.

== Some formulae in internal-ratings-based approach ==
Some credit assessments in standardised approach refer to unrated assessment. Basel II also encourages banks to initiate internal ratings-based approach for measuring credit risks. Banks are expected to be more capable of adopting more sophisticated techniques in credit risk management.

Banks can determine their own estimation for some components of risk measure: the probability of default (PD), exposure at default (EAD) and effective maturity (M). The goal is to define risk weights by determining the cut-off points between and within areas of the expected loss (EL) and the unexpected loss (UL), where the regulatory capital should be held, in the probability of default. Then, the risk weights for individual exposures are calculated based on the function provided by Basel II.

Below are the formulae for some banks' major products: corporate, small-medium enterprise (SME), residential mortgage and qualifying revolving retail exposure.

Notes:

- 10 Function is taken from paragraph 272
- 11 Function is taken from paragraph 273
- 12 Function is taken from paragraph 328
- 13 Function is taken from paragraph 229

In Basel II: International Convergence of Capital Measurement and Capital Standards: a Revised Framework (BCBS) (November 2005 Revision)

- PD = the probability of default
- LGD = loss given default
- EAD = exposure at default
- M = effective maturity

== Advantages ==
Basel-II benefits customers with lower probability of default. Basel-II benefits banks to hold lower capital requirement as having corporate customers with lower probability of default (Graph 1). Basel-II benefits SME customers to be treated differently from corporates. Basel-II benefits banks to hold lower capital requirement as having credit card product customers with lower probability of default (Graph 2).
