= Standardized approach (counterparty credit risk) =

Global banking standard

The standardized approach for counterparty credit risk (SA-CCR) is the capital requirement framework under Basel III addressing counterparty risk for derivative trades. It was published by the Basel Committee in March 2014. See Basel III: Finalising post-crisis reforms.

The framework replaced both non-internal model approaches: the Current Exposure Method (CEM) and the Standardised Method (SM). It is intended to be a "risk-sensitive methodology", i.e. conscious of asset class and hedging, that differentiates between margined and non-margined trades and recognizes netting benefits; considerations insufficiently addressed under the preceding frameworks.

SA-CCR calculates the exposure at default, EAD, of derivatives and "long-settlement transactions" exposed to counterparty credit risk, where EAD = α × (RC + PFE). Here, α is a multiplier of 1.4, acting as a "buffer" to ensure sufficient coverage; and:

- RC is the "Replacement Cost" were the counterparty to default today: the current exposure, i.e. mark-to-market of all trades, is aggregated by counterparty, and then netted-off with haircutted- collateral.
- PFE is the "Potential Future Exposure" to the counterparty: per asset class, trade-"add-ons" are aggregated to "hedging sets", with positions allowed to offset based on specified correlation assumptions, thereby reducing net exposure; these are in turn aggregated to counterparty "netting sets"; this aggregated amount is then offset by the counterparty's collateral (i.e. initial margin), which is subject to a "multiplier" that limits its benefit, applying a 5% floor to the exposure.

The SA-CCR EAD is an input to the bank's regulatory capital calculation where it is combined with the counterparty's PD and LGD to derive RWA; some banks thus incorporate SA-CCR into their KVA calculations. Because of its two-step aggregation, capital allocation between bank dealing desks (or even asset classes) is challenging; thus making it difficult to fairly calculate each desk's risk-adjusted return on capital. Various methods are then proposed here. SA-CCR is also input to other regulatory results such as the leverage ratio and the net stable funding ratio.
