= George S. Oldfield =

- Education: College of William & Mary (BA); University of Pennsylvania (MA, PhD)
- Occupation: Economist
- Organization(s): Dartmouth College; Cornell University

George S. Oldfield is a financial economist. He has been published extensively, and is cited for his work on the effects of a firm's unvested pension benefits on its share price published in the Journal of Money, Credit and Banking in 1977.

== Education ==
Oldfield holds a Ph.D. and M.A. in finance from the Wharton School at the University of Pennsylvania. He also earned an A.B. in economics from the College of William and Mary.

== Career ==
He was the Richard S. Reynolds, Jr. Professor of Finance at the Mason School of Business at the College of William & Mary, and a faculty member at the Amos Tuck School of Business Administration at Dartmouth College and the S.C. Johnson Graduate School of Management at Cornell University. He is the 2002 recipient of the Business Week Business School Survey "Master Teacher" award.

He is a consultant with The Brattle Group, and in government, has worked at the Federal Reserve Bank of New York, the Federal Reserve Bank of Philadelphia and served as Economic Research Fellow at the U.S. Securities and Exchange Commission where he focused on employee stock option and financial derivatives pricing, disclosure rules for corporate pension funding and executive compensation and asset-backed and mortgage-backed securities.

== Publications ==
Oldfield's other publications include:

- Logue, Dennis; Oldfield, George S. (2008). "Lawsuits Stalk Pension Fiduciaries" (PDF). Finance: Current Topics in Corporate Finance (1). The Brattle Group. Archived from the original (PDF) on 2011-07-08.
- Oldfield, George S.; Cragg, Michael (2008). "Understanding the Credit Crisis: The Treasury, the Fed, and the Banking System" (PDF). Finance: Current Topics in Corporate Finance (2). The Brattle Group. Archived from the original (PDF) on 2011-07-08.
- Oldfield, George S. (March 2008). "Expanding Subprime Mortgage Crisis Increases Litigation Risks" (PDF). The Brattle Group, Inc. Archived from the original (PDF) on 2011-07-08.
- Oldfield, George S. (2007). "Subprime Mortgage Problems: What to Look For and Where to Look". Finance: Current Topics in Corporate Finance (1). The Brattle Group. Archived from the original (PDF) on 2011-07-08.
- Oldfield, George S. (May–June 2004). "Bond Games". Financial Analysts Journal. 60 (3): 52–66. doi:10.2469/faj.v60.n3.2621. S2CID 218507872.
- Oldfield, George S.; Logue, Dennis E. (1994). Handbook of Modern Finance: The Determination of Interest Rates. Warren, Gorham & Lamont. pp. Chapter B1. ISBN 978-0-7913-0311-5.
- Oldfield, George S. (Winter 2000–2001). "Bits, Bets, and Making Book on an Index". Journal of Risk. 3 (2): 91–106. doi:10.21314/JOR.2001.040.
- Oldfield, George S. (September 2000). "Making Markets for Structured Mortgage Derivatives". Journal of Financial Economics. 57 (3): 445–471. doi:10.1016/S0304-405X(00)00064-7.
- Oldfield, George S.; Santomero, Anthony M. (Fall 1997). "Risk Management in Financial Institutions". Sloan Management Review.
- Oldfield, George S. "The Economics of Structured Finance". The Journal of Fixed Income (September 1997).
- Oldfield, George S; Jarrow, Robert A. (1988). "Forward Options and Futures Options". Advances in Futures and Options Research.
- Oldfield, George S.; Rogalski, Richard J. (March 1987). "The Stochastic Properties of Term Structure Movements". Journal of Monetary Economics. 19 (2): 229–254. doi:10.1016/0304-3932(87)90048-1.
- Oldfield, George S.; O’Hara, Maureen (December 1986). "The Microeconomics of Market Making". Journal of Financial and Quantitative Analysis.
- Oldfield, George S.; Rogalski, Richard J. (June 1980). "Common Stock Returns Over Open and Closed Trading Periods". Journal of Finance. 35. doi:10.1111/j.1540-6261.1980.tb03495.x.
- Oldfield, George S.; Rovira, Carlos E. (Winter 1984). "Futures Contract Options". Journal of Futures Markets. 4 (4): 479–490. doi:10.1002/fut.3990040404.
- Oldfield, George S.; Jarrow, Robert A. (December 1981). "Forward Contracts and Futures Contracts". Journal of Financial Economics.
- Oldfield, George S.; Rogalski, Richard J. (May 1981). "Treasury Bill Factors and Common Stock Returns". Journal of Finance. 36 (2): 337–350. doi:10.1111/j.1540-6261.1981.tb00446.x.
- Oldfield, George S.; Bower, Richard S. (March 1981). "On Lessees, Lessors, and Whether Pigs Have Wings". Journal of Business Research.
- Oldfield, George S.; Bierman, Harold (September 1979). "Corporate Debt and Corporate Taxes". Journal of Finance.
- Oldfield, George S.; Rogalski, Richard J.; Jarrow, Robert A. (December 1977). "An Autoregressive Jump Process for Common Stock Returns". Journal of Financial Economics. 5 (3): 389–418. doi:10.1016/0304-405X(77)90045-9.
- Oldfield, George S.; Messina, Richard J. (September 1977). "Forward Exchange Price Determination in Continuous Time". Journal of Financial and Quantitative Analysis. 12 (3): 473–479. doi:10.2307/2330546. JSTOR 2330546. S2CID 154557679.
- Oldfield, George S.; Logue, Dennis E. (Summer 1977). "Managing Foreign Assets When Foreign Exchange Markets Are Efficient". Financial Management.
- Oldfield, George S.; Logue, Dennis E. (Spring 1977). "What's So Special About Foreign Exchange Markets?". Journal of Portfolio Management.
