= Standardized approach (credit risk) =

Set of credit risk measurement techniques

The term standardized approach (or standardised approach) refers to a set of credit risk measurement techniques proposed under Basel II, which sets capital adequacy rules for banking institutions.

Under this approach the banks are required to use ratings from external credit rating agencies to quantify required capital for credit risk. In many countries this is the only approach regulators approved in the initial phase of Basel II implementation. The Basel II accord proposes to permit banks a choice between two broad methodologies for calculating their capital requirements for credit risk. The other alternative is based on internal ratings.

Reforms to the standardised approach to credit risk are due to be introduced under the Basel III: Finalising post-crisis reforms.

== The summary of risk weights in standardized approach ==
There are some options in weighing risks for some claims, below are the summary as it might be likely to be implemented.

NOTE: For some "unrated" risk weights, banks are encouraged to use their own internal-ratings system based on Foundation IRB and Advanced IRB in Internal-Ratings Based approach with a set of formulae provided by the Basel-II accord. There exist several alternative weights for some of the following claim categories published in the original framework text.

- Claims on sovereigns

Credit Assessment	AAA to AA-	A+ to A-	BBB+ to BBB-	BB+ to B-	Below B-	unrated
Risk Weight	0%	20%	50%	100%	150%	100%

- Claims on the BIS, the IMF, the ECB, the EC and the MDBs

Risk Weight: 0%

- Claims on banks and securities companies

Related to assessment of sovereign as banks and securities companies are regulated.

Credit Assessment	AAA to AA-	A+ to A-	BBB+ to BBB-	BB+ to B-	Below B-	unrated
Risk Weight	20%	50%	100%	100%	150%	100%

- Claims on corporates

Credit Assessment	AAA to AA-	A+ to A-	BBB+ to BB-	Below BB-	unrated
Risk Weight	20%	50%	100%	150%	100%

- Claims on retail products

This includes credit card, overdraft, auto loans, personal finance and small business.

Risk weight: 75%

- Claims secured by residential property

Risk weight: 35%

- Claims secured by commercial real estate

Risk weight: 100%

- Overdue loans

more than 90 days other than residential mortgage loans.

Risk weight:
150% for provisions that are less than 20% of the outstanding amount
100% for provisions that are between 20% - 49% of the outstanding amount
100% for provisions that are no less than 50% of the outstanding amount, but with supervisory discretion are reduced to 50% of the outstanding amount

- Other assets

Risk weight: 100%

- Cash

Risk weight: 0%
