= XVA =

Banking valuation adjustments

In mathematical finance, X-Value Adjustment (XVA, xVA) is an umbrella term referring to a number of different "valuation adjustments" that banks must make when assessing the value of derivative contracts that they have entered into. The purpose of these is twofold: primarily to hedge for possible losses due to other parties' failures to pay amounts due on the derivative contracts; but also to determine (and hedge) the amount of capital required under the bank capital adequacy rules. XVA has led to the creation of specialized desks in many banking institutions to manage XVA exposures.

== Context ==
Historically, (OTC) derivative pricing has relied on the Black–Scholes risk neutral pricing framework which assumes that funding is available at the risk free rate and that traders can perfectly replicate derivatives so as to fully hedge.

This, in turn, assumes that derivatives can be traded without taking on credit risk. During the 2008 financial crisis, many financial institutions failed, leaving their counterparts with claims on derivative contracts that were paid only in part. Therefore it became clear that counterparty credit risk must also be considered in derivatives valuation, and the risk neutral value is to be adjusted correspondingly.

== Valuation adjustments ==
When a derivative's exposure is collateralized, the "fair-value" is computed as before, but using the overnight index swap (OIS) curve for discounting. The OIS is chosen here as it reflects the rate for overnight secured lending between banks, and is thus considered a good indicator of the interbank credit markets. See multi-curve framework.

When the exposure is not collateralized then a credit valuation adjustment, or CVA, is subtracted from this value (the logic: an institution insists on paying less for the option, knowing that the counterparty may default on its unrealized gain). This CVA is the discounted risk-neutral expectation value of the loss expected due to the counterparty not paying in accordance with the contractual terms, and is typically calculated under a simulation framework; see Credit valuation adjustment § Calculation.

A central complication in CVA is wrong-way risk (WWR), which occurs when exposure to a counterparty tends to increase as that counterparty's credit quality deteriorates. General wrong-way risk arises from broader market or macroeconomic factors, while specific wrong-way risk arises from a direct relationship between the counterparty and the transaction, its underlying exposure or its collateral. The converse, in which exposure decreases as the counterparty's likelihood of default increases, is known as right-way risk. Because CVA depends jointly on future exposure and counterparty default risk, these dependencies can be incorporated into the Monte Carlo simulation rather than treating exposure and creditworthiness as independent.

When transactions are governed by a master agreement that includes netting-off of contract exposures, then the expected loss from a default depends on the net exposure of the whole portfolio of derivative trades outstanding under the agreement rather than being calculated on a transaction-by-transaction basis. The CVA (and xVA) applied to a new transaction should be the incremental effect of the new transaction on the portfolio CVA.

While the CVA reflects the market value of counterparty credit risk, additional Valuation Adjustments for debit, funding cost, regulatory capital and margin may similarly be added. As with CVA, these results are modeled via simulation as a function of the risk-neutral expectation of (a) the values of the underlying instrument and the relevant market values, and (b) the creditworthiness of the counterparty. This approach relies on an extension of the economic arguments underlying standard derivatives valuation.

These XVA include the following; and will require careful and correct aggregation to avoid double counting:

- DVA, Debit Valuation Adjustment: analogous to CVA, the adjustment (increment) to a derivative price due to the institution's own default risk. DVA is basically CVA from the counterparty’s perspective. If one party incurs a CVA loss, the other party records a corresponding DVA gain. (Bilateral Valuation Adjustment, BVA = DVA-CVA.)
- FVA, Funding Valuation Adjustment, due to the funding implications of a trade that is not under Credit Support Annex (CSA), or is under a partial CSA; essentially the funding cost or benefit due to the difference (variation margin) between the funding rate of the bank's treasury and the collateral rate paid by a clearing house.
- MVA, Margin Valuation Adjustment, refers to the funding costs of the initial margin specific to centrally cleared transactions. It may be calculated according to the global rules for non-centrally cleared derivatives rules.
- KVA, the Valuation Adjustment for regulatory capital that must be held by the Institution against the exposure throughout the life of the contract (lately applying SA-CCR).

Other adjustments are also sometimes made including TVA, for tax, and RVA, for replacement of the derivative on downgrade. FVA may be decomposed into FCA for receivables and FBA for payables – where FCA is due to self-funded borrowing spread over Libor, and FBA due to self funded lending. Relatedly, LVA represents the specific liquidity adjustment, while CollVA is the value of the optionality embedded in a CSA to post collateral in different currencies. CRA, the collateral rate adjustment, reflects the present value of the expected excess of net interest paid on cash collateral over the net interest that would be paid if the interest rate equaled the risk-free rate.

== Accounting impact ==
Per the IFRS 13 accounting standard, fair value is defined as "the price that would be received to sell an asset or paid to transfer a liability in an orderly transaction between market participants at the measurement date." Accounting rules thus mandate the inclusion of CVA, and DVA, in mark-to-market accounting.

One notable impact of this standard is that bank earnings are subject to XVA volatility, largely a function of changing counterparty credit risk. A major task of the XVA-desk, therefore, is to hedge this exposure; see Financial risk management § Banking. This is achieved by buying, for example, credit default swaps: this "CDS protection" applies in that its value is driven, also, by the counterparty's credit worthiness. Hedges can also counter the variability of the exposure component of CVA risk, offsetting PFE at a given quantile.

Under Basel III banks are required to hold specific regulatory capital on the net CVA-risk. (To distinguish: this charge for CVA addresses the potential mark-to-market loss, while the SA-CCR framework addresses counterparty risk itself.) Two approaches are available for calculating the CVA required-capital: the standardised approach (SA-CVA) and the basic approach (BA-CVA). Banks must use BA-CVA unless they receive approval from their relevant supervisory authority to use SA-CVA.

The XVA-desk is then responsible for managing counterparty risk as well as (minimizing) the capital requirements under Basel. The requirements of the XVA-desk differ from those of the Risk Control group and it is not uncommon to see institutions use different systems for risk exposure management on one hand, and XVA pricing and hedging on the other, with the desk employing its own quants.

== Bibliography ==
- Andrew Green (2015). XVA: Credit, Funding and Capital Valuation Adjustments. Wiley. ISBN 978-1-118-55678-8.
- Jon Gregory (2015). The xVA Challenge: Counterparty Credit Risk, Funding, Collateral, and Capital (3rd ed.). Wiley. ISBN 978-1-119-10941-9.
- Chris Kenyon and Andrew Green (Eds) (2016). Landmarks in XVA: From Counterparty Risk to Funding Costs and Capital. Risk Books. ISBN 978-1782722557.
- Roland Lichters, Roland Stamm and Donal Gallagher (2015). Modern Derivatives Pricing and Credit Exposure Analysis: Theory and Practice of CSA and XVA Pricing, Exposure Simulation and Backtesting. Palgrave Macmillan. ISBN 978-1137494832.
- Dongsheng Lu (2015). The XVA of Financial Derivatives: CVA, DVA and FVA Explained. Palgrave Macmillan. ISBN 978-1137435835.
- Ignacio Ruiz (2015). XVA Desks – A New Era for Risk Management. Palgrave Macmillan UK. ISBN 978-1-137-44819-4.
- Antoine Savine and Jesper Andreasen (2021). Modern Computational Finance: Scripting for Derivatives and XVA. Wiley. ISBN 978-1119540786.
- Donald J. Smith (2017). Valuation in a World of CVA, DVA, and FVA: A Tutorial on Debt Securities and Interest Rate Derivatives. World Scientific. ISBN 978-9813222748.
- Alexander Sokol (2014). Long-Term Portfolio Simulation: For XVA, Limits, Liquidity and Regulatory Capital. Risk Books. ISBN 978-1782720959.
- Osamu Tsuchiya (2019). A Practical Approach to XVA. World Scientific. ISBN 978-9813272750.
