= Credit conversion factor =

Measurement in credit rating

The credit conversion factor (CCF) is a coefficient in the field of credit rating. It is the ratio between the additional amount of a loan used in the future and the amount that could be claimed.

== Background ==
The key variables for (credit) risk assessment are the probability of default (PD), the loss given default (LGD) and the exposure at default (EAD). The credit conversion factor calculates the amount of a free credit line and other off-balance-sheet transactions (with the exception of derivatives) to an EAD amount and is an integral part in the European banking regulation since the Basel II accords. In an off-balance-sheet product, the bank is obligated to provide the money to the debtor once the need arises. To calculate the amount of money lost in the case of a default, it is common practice to weight the amount of future obligations with those which could in principle be drawn.

=== Example ===
Assume you are allowed to draw a credit of 1000 Euros of which you already got 200 Euros from your bank last month. In other words, you can still obtain 800 Euros in the current month. If you today get another credit of 500 Euros, the CCF is 500 Euros divided by 800 Euros, which evaluates to 62.5%.

== Critiques ==
A possible drawback of the CCF is that it is backward looking (usually over a period of 12 months) which might be not appropriate for evaluating the EAD at a given time.
