= InSoil =

Climate technology company

- Formerly: HeavyFinance
- Type: Private
- Industry: Financial technologies, climate technologies
- Founded: 2020; 6 years ago
- Headquarters: Vilnius, Lithuania
- Key people: Laimonas Noreika, Darius Verseckas, Andrius Liukaitis
- Brands: InSoil
- AUM: €70 million (2024)
- Number of employees: 65 (2024)
- Website: insoil.com

InSoil (formerly HeavyFinance) is a Lithuanian environmental technology investment company that operates a marketplace for the agricultural industry. The company facilitates investments in debt capital for small and medium-sized agricultural enterprises to switch and expand regenerative agriculture practices such as no-till farming, mixed crop rotation, cover cropping, and the application of compost and manure.

The company is registered as a crowdfunding service provider with the European Securities and Markets Authority (ESMA).

== History ==
In 2020, Laimonas Noreika, Darius Verseckas and Andrius Liukaitis co-founded InSoil in Vilnius, Lithuania registering the company's offering with the Central Bank of Lithuania.

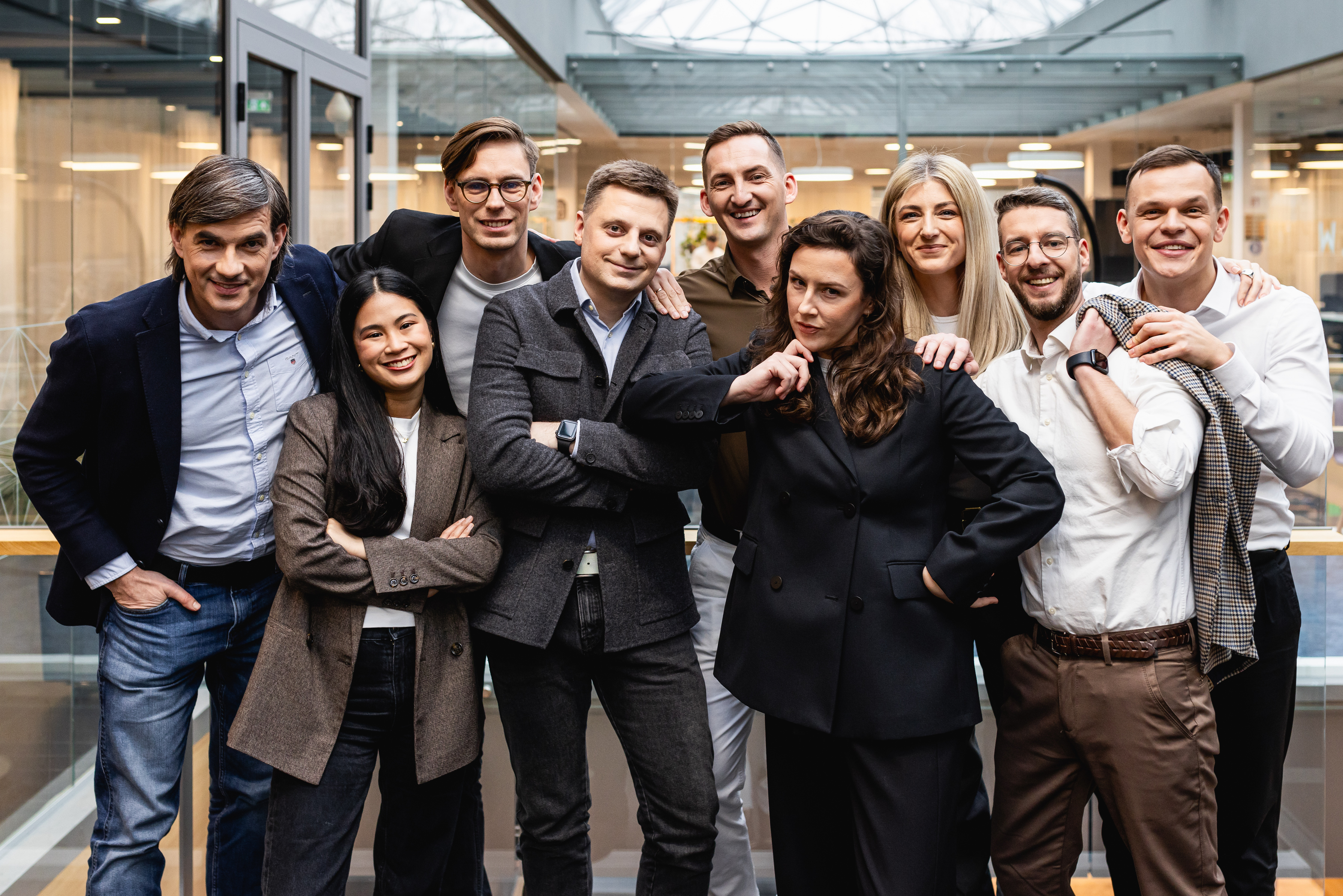
InSoil management team

In 2021, InSoil raised US$1 million in a round led by a Polish venture capital firm bValue to fill the funding gap for small and medium-sized European farms of €19.8 to €46.6 billion, as identified by the European Commission together with the European Investment Bank.

Over the initial three-year period, the company facilitated the issuance of over €27 million through approximately 1,000 loans. In 2022, lending activities experienced growth, with the total number of loans disbursed increasing from 427 in the previous year (valued at €13.5 million) to 651 loans, totaling €16.2 million.

In 2023, InSoil raised €3 million in a seed funding round led by Practica Capital and launched green loans to accelerate the adoption of regenerative agriculture. A joint venture with Scottish firm Agricarbon was started.

As of May 2024, InSoil had provided assistance to more than 2,000 farm owners, with an average loan size of €31,000.

== Services ==
InSoil enables small and medium-sized farms to create agriculture business loans between €10,000 and €200,000. Investors are able to browse the loan listings on the InSoil website and select loans that they want to invest in based on balance sheet, income statement and other information supplied about the farm, amount of loan, collateralized debt obligation, loan rating, and loan purpose.

InSoil offers fixed interest green loans for carbon farming. Investors in green loans make money from nature-based carbon credits generated on the farm by applying regenerative agriculture.

The company also provides both collateralized and uncollateralized agricultural business loans. Investors in agriculture business loans earn interest on these loans.

== Locations ==
As of 2024, the company has offices in Bulgaria, Latvia, Lithuania, Poland, Portugal and Ukraine.

== See also ==
- Sustainable finance
- Carbon farming
- Verified Carbon Standard
- Regenerative agriculture
- Net zero emissions
- No-till farming
