= Sovereign credit risk =

Risk of a country not paying its debts

Sovereign credit risk is the risk of a government of a sovereign state becoming unwilling or unable to meet its loan or bond obligations leading to a sovereign default. Credit rating agencies will take into account the capital, interest, extraneous and procedural defaults, and failures to abide by the terms of bonds or other debt instruments when setting a country's credit rating.

A sovereign cannot be forced to pay its debts even when in a sovereign debt crisis but it may be able to use inflation and money printing to reduce its debts. The lender may also use its own government to pressure the sovereign through diplomatic and even military means. The United States government for example has the Foreign Claims Settlement Commission to help lenders recover debts from sovereigns. The risks for the lender are therefore different to loans to individuals or corporates. This risk can be mitigated by creditors and stakeholders taking extra precaution when making investments or financial transactions with foreign countries.

== Factors ==
Five key factors that affect the probability of sovereign debt leading to sovereign risk are: debt service ratio, import ratio, investment ratio, variance of export revenue, and domestic money supply growth. The probability of loss increases with increases in debt service ratio, import ratio, variance of export revenue and/or domestic money supply growth. Frenkel, Karmann, Raahish and Scholtens also argue that the likelihood of rescheduling decreases as investment ratio increases, due to resultant economic productivity gains.

However, Saunders argues that debt rescheduling can become more likely if the investment ratio rises as the foreign country could become less dependent on its external creditors and so be less concerned about receiving credit from these countries/investors.

== Sovereign debt crises ==
An example of states being unwilling or unable to meet its debt obligations was Cyprus in 2013. Many countries faced sovereign risk in the Great Recession of the late-2000s.

== See also ==
- 2012–2013 Cypriot financial crisis
- Bond vigilante
- Credit rating
- Foreign Claims Settlement Commission
- List of countries by credit rating
- List of sovereign debt crises
