= Allowance for Loan and Lease Losses =

US accounting standard

In banking, the Allowance for Loan and Lease Losses (ALLL), formerly known as the reserve for bad debts, is a calculated reserve that financial institutions establish in relation to the estimated credit risk within the institution's assets. This credit risk represents the charge-offs that will most likely be realized against an institution's operating income as of the financial statement end date. This reserve reduces the book value of the institution's loans and leases to the amount that the institution reasonably expects to collect.

The higher the estimated risk of uncollectable assets in the portfolio, the larger the ALLL reserve should be. The allowance is a topic of much regulatory scrutiny, and a review of the ALLL methodology is a significant portion of a financial institution's safety and soundness exam because it is important for federal bank examiners to ensure that an institution has a sufficient amount of capital in the allowance reserve. The allowance is also significant to bank management and directors as it has a large impact on an institution's earnings and capital.

An important regulatory statement describing the ALLL is the 2006 Interagency Policy Statement, jointly issued by the Office of the Comptroller of the Currency (OCC), the Board of Governors of the Federal Reserve System, the Federal Deposit Insurance Corporation (FDIC), the National Credit Union Administration (NCUA) and the Office of Thrift Supervision (OTS). In this statement, the regulators label the ALLL as one of the most significant estimates in an institution's financial statements and regulatory reports, and they advise:

“Because of its significance, each institution has a responsibility for developing, maintaining, and documenting a comprehensive, systematic, and consistently applied process for determining the amounts of the ALLL and the provision for loan and lease losses (PLLL). To fulfill this responsibility, each institution should ensure controls are in place to consistently determine the ALLL in accordance with GAAP, the institution’s stated policies and procedures, management’s best judgment and relevant supervisory guidance.”

== Frequency of review ==
The allowance for loan and lease losses is calculated by a financial institution at the end of each quarter or more often if it is justified by the institution's loan review process or an analysis of loan performance.

== Methodology ==
The methodology that a financial institution uses to estimate its reserve is influenced by the size of the institution, organizational structure, business strategies, loan portfolio makeup, loan analysis and administration policies, and management information systems. The variability in how a financial institution can the reserve can lead to challenges in estimating the ALLL, inconsistencies in how it is calculated over time, or confusion when presenting the reserve to the financial institution's board or examiners.

== Common challenges ==
Some of the general challenges that financial institutions face with regards to the ALLL estimation include the manual, time-intensive nature of the reserve estimation process each month or quarter; producing adequate documentation and disclosures; incorporating new accounting standards and regulations released by FASB and federal regulatory bodies, and increased scrutiny on the assumptions used to determine the ASC 450-20 and ASC 310-10-35 reserves.

The Financial Accounting Standards Board (FASB) has announced plans to change the way banks account for the impairment of assets in the ALLL. The final ruling, the Current Expected Credit Losses (CECL) model, was released in June 2016.
