= Robert A. Jarrow =

- Education: Duke University (BA); Dartmouth College (MBA); Massachusetts Institute of Technology (PhD)
- Known for: Heath–Jarrow–Morton framework Jarrow–Turnbull model
- Scientific career
- Fields: Finance
- Workplaces: Cornell University
- Doctoral advisor: Robert C. Merton

Robert Alan Jarrow is the Ronald P. and Susan E. Lynch Professor of Investment Management at the Cornell Johnson Graduate School of Management. Professor Jarrow is a co-creator of the Heath–Jarrow–Morton framework for pricing interest rate derivatives, a co-creator of the reduced form Jarrow–Turnbull credit risk models employed for pricing credit derivatives, and the creator of the forward price martingale measure. The three frameworks are used by major financial institutions to price and hedge derivatives.He is on the advisory board of Mathematical Finance – a journal he co-started in 1989. He is also an associate or advisory editor for numerous other journals and serves on the board of directors of several firms and professional societies. He is currently both an IAFE senior fellow and an FDIC senior fellow. He has served as the Director for Research of Kamakura Corporation since 1995.

Professor Jarrow has been the recipient of numerous prizes and awards including the CBOE Pomerance Prize for Excellence in the Area of Options Research, the Graham and Dodd Scrolls Award, and the 1997 International Association of Financial Engineers IAFE/SunGard Financial Engineer of the Year Award. He is included in both the Fixed Income Analysts Society Hall of Fame and Risk Magazine's 50 member Hall of Fame.

Publications include five books - Options Pricing, Finance Theory, Modeling Fixed Income Securities and Interest Rate Options (second edition), Derivative Securities (second edition), and An Introduction to Derivative Securities, Financial Markets, and Risk Management - as well as over 100 publications in leading finance and economic journals.

He graduated magna cum laude from Duke University in 1974 with a major in mathematics, received an MBA from the Tuck School of Business at Dartmouth College in 1976 with highest distinction, and in 1979 he obtained a PhD in finance from the MIT Sloan School of Management under Robert C. Merton.

== Selected publications ==
- Oldfield, George S.; Jarrow, Robert A. (1988) "Forward Options and Futures Options". Advances in Futures and Options Research
- Oldfield, George S.; Jarrow, Robert A. (December 1981). "Forward Contracts and Futures Contracts". Journal of Financial Economics.
- Oldfield, George S.; Rogalski, Richard J.; Jarrow, Robert A. (December 1977). "An Autoregressive Jump Process for Common Stock Returns". Journal of Financial Economics. 5 (3): 389–418. doi:10.1016/0304-405X(77)90045-9.
- Jarrow, Robert A. (2008). Financial Derivatives Pricing: Selected Works of Robert Jarrow. World Scientific. p. 608. doi:10.1142/6911. ISBN 978-981-281-920-8.
- Jarrow, Robert A. and Chatterjea, Arkadev (2019). Introduction to Derivative Securities, Financial Markets, and Risk Management (2ed). World Scientific. p. 772. doi:10.1142/Y0018. ISBN 9781944659653. S2CID 152970011.

== See also ==
- Heath–Jarrow–Morton framework
- Jarrow–Turnbull model
