= Basel III =

Banking regulation framework

Basel III is a framework published by the Basel Committee on Banking Supervision (BCBS) in response to the deficiencies in financial regulation revealed by the 2008 financial crisis. It sets international standards and recommendations for bank capital requirements, stress tests, liquidity regulations, and leverage, with the goal of mitigating the risk of bank runs and bank failures. Basel III builds upon the standards of Basel II, introduced in 2004, and Basel I, introduced in 1988.

Basel III are minimum recommendations; each country that chooses to adopt Basel III must translate the guidance into laws that are binding upon its financial institutions.

== History ==
The Basel III standards were published by the BCBS in September 2010 and began to be implemented by central banks shortly thereafter. Clarifications and guidance were published intermittently.

The standards were modified by Basel III: Finalising post-crisis reforms, (also known as Basel III Endgame, Basel 3.1, and Capital Requirements Regulations III). These include the Fundamental Review of the Trading Book, which handles how capital requirements are calculated. Implementation has been completed only in some countries and is scheduled to be completed in the European Union in 2027, with a 3-year phase-in period. In the United Kingdom, the Standardised Approach (SA) will be implemented on January 1, 2027, and the Internal Models Approach (IMA) will be implemented on January 1, 2028. Japan began phasing in Basel 3.1 standards between 2024 and 2029. It will be implemented in India in April 2027. It was implemented in Canada in the early 2020s. In the United States, an initial proposal from regulators published in 2023 received pushback and was rewritten in 2026; the timeline for implementation is uncertain.

== Key principles ==
- The quality, consistency, and transparency of the capital base was raised.
  - Tier 1 capital: the predominant form of Tier 1 capital must be common shares and retained earnings. This is subject to prudential deductions, including goodwill and intangible assets.
  - Tier 2 capital: supplementary capital, however, the instruments were harmonised.
  - Tier 3 capital was eliminated.
- The risk coverage of the capital framework was strengthened.
  - Promoted more integrated management of market and counterparty credit risk
  - Added the credit valuation adjustment–risk due to deterioration in counterparty's credit rating
  - Strengthened the capital requirements for counterparty credit exposures arising from banks' derivatives, repo and securities financing transactions
  - Raised the capital buffers backing these exposures
  - Reduced procyclicality and
  - Provided additional incentives to move OTC derivative contracts to qualifying central counterparties (probably clearing houses). Where a bank acts as a clearing member of a central counterparty for its own purposes, a risk weight of 2% must be applied to the bank’s trade exposure to the central counterparty.
  - Provided incentives to strengthen the risk management of counterparty credit exposures
  - Raised counterparty credit risk management standards by including wrong way risk
- A series of measures was introduced to promote the buildup of capital buffers in good times that can be drawn upon in periods of stress ("Reducing procyclicality and promoting countercyclical buffers").
  - Measures to address procyclicality:
    - Dampen excess cyclicality of the minimum capital requirement;
    - Promoted more forward looking provisions;
    - Conserved capital to build buffers at individual banks and the banking sector that can be used in stress; and
  - Achieved the broader macroprudential goal of protecting the banking sector from periods of excess credit growth.
    - Requirement to use long-term data horizons to estimate probabilities of default
    - downturn loss given default estimates, recommended in Basel II, to become mandatory
    - Improved calibration of the risk functions, which convert loss estimates into regulatory capital requirements.
    - Banks must conduct stress tests that include scenarios of widening yield spreads in recessions.
  - Stronger provisioning practices (forward-looking provisioning):
    - Advocates a change in the accounting standards towards an expected loss (EL) approach (usually, EL amount := LGD*PD*EAD).

=== Common Equity Tier 1 (CET1) capital requirements ===
$$\frac{\mbox{CET1}}{\mbox{RWAs}} = \mbox{CET1}\;\textrm{ratio}$$

Basel III requires banks to have a minimum CET1 ratio (Common Tier 1 capital divided by risk-weighted assets (RWAs)) at all times of:

- 4.5%

Plus:

- A mandatory "capital conservation buffer" or "stress capital buffer requirement", equivalent to at least 2.5% of risk-weighted assets, but could be higher based on results from stress tests, as determined by national regulators.

Plus:

- If necessary, as determined by national regulators, a "counter-cyclical buffer" of up to an additional 2.5% of RWA as capital during periods of high credit growth. This must be met by CET1 capital.

In the U.S., an additional 1% is required for globally systemically important financial institutions.

It also requires minimum Tier 1 capital of 6% at all times.

Common Tier 1 capital comprises shareholders equity (including audited profits), less deductions of accounting reserve that are not believed to be loss absorbing "today", including goodwill and other intangible assets. To prevent the potential of double-counting of capital across the economy, bank's holdings of other bank shares are also deducted.

=== Tier 2 capital requirements ===
Tier 2 capital + Tier 1 capital is required to be above 8%.

=== Leverage ratio requirements ===
Leverage ratio is calculated by dividing Tier 1 capital by the bank's leverage exposure. The leverage exposure is the sum of the exposures of all on-balance sheet assets, 'add-ons' for derivative exposures and securities financing transactions (SFTs), and credit conversion factors for off-balance sheet items.

Basel III introduced a minimum leverage ratio of 3%.

$$\frac{\mbox{Tier 1 Capital}}{\mbox{Total exposure}} \geq 3\%$$

The U.S. established another ratio, the supplemental leverage ratio, defined as Tier 1 capital divided by total assets. It is required to be above 3.0%. A minimum leverage ratio of 5% is required for large banks and systemically important financial institutions. In the EU, the minimum bank leverage ratio is the same 3% as required by Basel III. The UK requires a minimum leverage ratio, for banks with deposits greater than £50 billion, of 3.25%. This higher minimum reflects the PRA's differing treatment of the leverage ratio, which excludes central bank reserves in 'Total exposure' of the calculation.

=== Liquidity requirements ===
Basel III introduced two required liquidity/funding ratios.

==== Liquidity coverage ratio ====
The liquidity coverage ratio requires banks to hold sufficient high-quality liquid assets to cover its total net cash outflows over 30 days under a stressed scenario. This was implemented because some adequately-capitalized banks faced difficulties because of poor liquidity management. The LCR consists of two parts: the numerator is the value of HQLA, and the denominator consists of the total net cash outflows over a specified stress period (total expected cash outflows minus total expected cash inflows). Mathematically it is expressed as follows:

$\text{LCR} = \frac{\text{High quality liquid assets}}{\text{Total net liquidity outflows over 30 days}} \geq 100\%$

Regulators can allow banks to dip below their required liquidity levels per the liquidity coverage ratio during periods of stress.

In the U.S. version, Bonds and securities issued by financial institutions, as well as certain mortgage backed securities, which can become illiquid during a financial crisis, are not included in HQLA.

==== Net stable funding ratio ====
The net stable funding ratio requires banks to hold sufficient stable funding to exceed the required amount of stable funding over a one-year period of extended stress. The Net Stable Funding Ratio seeks to calculate the proportion of Available Stable Funding (ASF), via equity and certain liabilities, over Required Stable Funding (RSF) via the assets.

$\text{NSFR}=\frac{\mbox{Available amount of stable funding}}{\mbox{Required amount of stable funding }} =\frac{\mbox{ASF}}{\mbox{RSF}} > 100\%$

These components of stable funding are not equally weighted.

Off-balance sheet categories are also weighted as they contribute to both the assets and liabilities. This is best explained by the potential for contingent calls on funding liquidity (revocable and irrevocable line of credit and liquidity facilities to clients). Therefore off-balance sheet commitments need to be funded, with the stable funding. This may help prevent the excessive use of the shadow banking system, including special purpose entity and structured investment vehicle, as these often benefit from liquidity facilities (so-called back-stop facilities) granted by the bank.

=== Counterparty risk: CCPs and SA-CCR ===
The standardised approach for counterparty credit risk (SA-CCR) replaced the current exposure method. SA-CCR is used to measure the exposure at default of derivative transactions and in the leverage exposure measure and non-modelled Risk Weighted Asset calculations, with potential exposure to central counterparty clearing default.

=== Capital requirements for equity investments in funds ===
The framework requires banks to take account of an investment fund's leverage when determining risk-based capital requirements associated with the investment and more appropriately reflecting the risk of the fund's underlying investments, including the use of a 1,250% risk weight for situations in which there is not sufficient transparency.

=== Limiting large exposure to external and internal counterparties ===
The Large Exposures Framework (LEX) restricts a financial institution's maximum loss from any single counterparty failure to 25% of its Tier 1 capital. Exposures between Global systemically important financial institution have a stricter limit of 15% of Tier 1 capital. An exposure is defined as a "large exposure" if it reaches or exceeds 10% of the bank's eligible capital base.

=== Capital standards for securitisations ===
A revised securitisation framework, effective in 2018, aims to address shortcomings in the Basel II securitisation framework and to strengthen the capital standards for securitisations held on bank balance sheets. The frameworks addresses the calculation of minimum capital needs for securitisation exposures.

Basel III reclassifies physical gold from a Tier 3 asset to a Tier 1 asset.

=== Interest rate risk in the banking book ===
New standards for "interest rate risk in the banking book" (IRRBB) became effective in 2023. Banks are required to calculate their exposures based on "economic value of equity" (EVE) and "net interest income" (NII) under a set of prescribed interest rate shock scenarios. The standards thereby deal with the risks associated with a change in interest rates, including interest rate gaps, basis risk, yield curve risk, and option risk.

The bank's exposure to IRRBB is then equal to the largest negative change in EVE across all scenarios - in essence, the theoretical risk to the economic value of a bank's equity from a change in interest rates.

IRRBB falls under Pillar II.

=== Basel III: Finalising post-crisis reforms ===
The Basel III: Finalising post-crisis reforms standards cover further reforms in six areas:

- a revised standardised approach for credit risk (SA-CR), which will improve the robustness and risk sensitivity of the existing approach;
- revisions to the internal ratings based approach (IRB) for credit risk, where the use of the most advanced internally modelled approaches for low-default portfolios will be limited;
- revisions to the Credit valuation adjustment risk (the process through which counterparty credit is valued, priced and hedged - using a standardised approach), including the removal of the internally modelled approach and the introduction of a revised standardised approach;
- a revised standardised approach for Operational risk, which will replace the existing standardised approaches and the advanced measurement approaches; based on income and historical losses of the bank
- an aggregate output floor, which will ensure that banks' risk-weighted assets (RWAs) generated by internal models are no lower than 72.5% of RWAs as calculated by the Basel III framework's standardised approaches. Banks are also be required to disclose their RWAs based on these standardised approaches. Replaces Basel II output floor with a more robust risk-sensitive floor and disclosure requirements;
- revisions to the measurement of the leverage ratio and a leverage ratio buffer for global systemically important financial institutions (G-SIBs), which will take the form of a Tier 1 capital buffer set at 50% of a G-SIB's risk-weighted capital buffer; definitions and requirements, exposure measures for on-balance sheet exposures, derivatives, securities financing transactions and off-balance sheet items.

The reforms revise the standardised approach for credit risk (SA-CR), the internal ratings-based approach for credit risk (IRB), the credit valuation adjustment (CVA) framework, the calculation of operational risk RWAs, the leverage ratio, and introduce an aggregate output floor for risk weighted assets (RWAs).

=== Fundamental Review of the Trading Book ===
The Fundamental Review of the Trading Book set minimum capital requirements for market risk in the trading book based on a better calibrated standardised approach or internal model approval (IMA) for an expected shortfall measure rather than, under Basel II, value at risk.

The FRTB revisions address deficiencies relating to the prior Standardized approach and Internal models approach and particularly revisit the following:

- The boundary between the "trading book" and the "banking book": i.e. assets intended for active trading; as opposed to assets expected to be held to maturity, usually customer loans, and deposits from retail and corporate customers; important since the vast majority of losses were from trading books during the 2008 financial crisis.
- The use of expected shortfall instead of value at risk as a risk measure under stress; thus ensuring that banks capture tail risk events
- The risk of lack of market liquidity

FRTB additionally sets a "higher bar" for banks to use their own, internal models for calculating capital, as opposed to the standardised approach. Here, for a trading desk to qualify for the internal models approach, its model must pass two tests: a profit and loss attribution test and a backtest.

==== Calculation of capital requirements ====
As for other Basel frameworks, the Standardised Approach is directly implementable, but, at the same time, carries more capital; whereas the Internal Models approach, by contrast, carries less capital, but the modelling is more complex. More specifically, the calculations incorporate the above outlined enhancements, as follows.

- Under the Standardised Approach, the minimum capital requirement is the sum of three components: (i) Sensitivities-based capital, for seven risk classes, which reflects linear risks via their delta and vega (for options) risk factors, and non-linear risks via curvature. A capital charge is calculated here for three correlation scenarios, multiplying the sensitivities by supervisory risk-weights, and then applying rules for trade-by-trade and then overall aggregation, with the largest finally used. (ii) A default risk charge, capturing any jump-to-default risk. (iii) A residual risk add-on, appended for other market risks not captured, such as gap risk and behavioural risk.
- Under the Internal Models approach, the minimum capital requirement uses expected shortfall (i.e. as opposed to VaR) at a 97.5% quantile, with differentiated “liquidity horizons” for five categories of instruments (standard 10 days previously); the expected loss is calibrated to the one-year period of the most severe stress since 2005. For non-modellable risk factors, those where appropriate data does not exist, stress scenarios are used as a proxy. Capital requirements are calculated at the level of trading desks and are aggregated for the whole trading book. To this is appended a default risk charge.

== Shortcomings ==
Basel III can reduce economic growth via increased lending spreads. According to the Institute of International Finance, Basel III reduces economic growth and adds to the paper burden and risk inhibition by banks. It could also reduce returns to bank shareholders and increase costs to consumers and businesses. The standards lead to a significant increase in capital requirements, when the stated intention of the BCBS was for the changes to the standards to be capital neutral in terms of their aggregate impact, although not necessarily neutral for individual banks.

The framework's approach to risk which is based on risk weights derived from the past was criticised for failing to account for the uncertainty in the future. A study published by the OECD in December 2012 suggested that bank regulation based on the Basel accords encourage unconventional business practices and contributed to or even reinforced adverse systemic shocks that materialised during the 2008 financial crisis. According to the study, capital regulation based on risk-weighted assets encourages innovation designed to circumvent regulatory requirements and shifts banks' focus away from their core economic functions. Tighter capital requirements based on risk-weighted assets, introduced in the Basel III, may further contribute to these skewed incentives. New liquidity regulation, notwithstanding its good intentions, is another likely candidate to increase bank incentives to exploit regulation.

Basel III continues to allow large banks to calculate credit risk using internal models and for setting overall minimum capital requirements too low.

While institutions have many legitimate risk reduction reasons to deal in derivatives, such as for hedging or insurance, the Basel III accords:

- treat insurance buyers and sellers equally even though sellers take on more concentrated risks (literally purchasing them) which they are then expected to offset correctly without regulation
- do not require organizations to investigate correlations of all internal risks they own
- do not tax or charge institutions for the systematic or aggressive externalization or conflicted marketing of risk—other than requiring an orderly unravelling of derivatives in a crisis and stricter record keeping

Basel III continues to propagate a "too big to fail" status among financial institutions and the required stress tests do not account for unpredictable black swan theory events.

Basel III also increases incentives of banks to game the regulatory framework.

The increased capital requirements can reduce banks' abilities to make mortgage and small business loans.

In 2019, Michael Burry noted that Basel III affects the banks' willingness to take certain risks, even if doing so would be prudent.
