= Collection cost =

Cost incurred to collect debt that is owed

A collection cost is the cost incurred to collect debt that is owed, a process called debt collection. This could include expenditures for hiring a collection agency. Some contracts and regulations prescribe liquidated damages for collection costs. When collection costs occur, the debtor has pay off debt to get the collector out of collection cost.

== Legal treatment and regulation ==
Collection costs may be recoverable if authorized by contract or permitted by statute. In many jurisdictions, creditors may add reasonable collection expenses to the outstanding balance only if the original agreement provides for such recovery. Otherwise, additional charges may be limited or prohibited by consumer protection laws.

Under U.S. federal law, debt collectors are subject to the Fair Debt Collection Practices Act (FDCPA), which regulates how debts may be collected and prohibits unfair, deceptive, or abusive practices. The Act restricts the imposition of fees not expressly authorized by the agreement creating the debt or permitted by law.

== See also ==
- Credit risk
