= Wrong way risk =

Risk that exposure to a counterparty increases as their credit quality deteriorates

In the field of finance, a wrong way risk (WWR) occurs when credit exposure to a counterparty is negatively correlated with the credit quality of that counterparty. In other words, the more a party gains on a trade, the more likely it is for the counterparty to default. It is a source of concerns for banks and regulators, as it increases the overall counterparty credit risk.

It is opposed to right way risk (RWR), which occurs when one party's payment obligations are positively correlated to the same party's credit worthiness and thus reduces the overall counterparty credit risk.

Illustration of the correlations between Exposure and Probability of Default

== Types ==
=== Specific wrong way risk (SWWR) ===
Specific wrong way risk arises through poorly structured transactions or through factors that are specific to the counterparty, such as a rating downgrade or a litigation. An example could be a company selling a put option on its own stock. If the stock suddenly loses value, the company's credit quality will decrease, while also increasing its liability to the owner of the put option.

=== General wrong way risk (GWWR) ===
General wrong way risk (also known as conjectural wrong way risk) arises through macroeconomic factors that are not specifically affecting the counterparty, such as a shock on interest rates.

An example could be an interest rate swap between two parties, where Party A agrees to pay to Party B a fixed interest rate in exchange for a floating interest rate. If interest rates rise globally, Party A's exposure increases while the counterparty's likelihood of default increases (as it is now obligated to make larger interest payments).
