= Risk-based pricing =

Methodology for pricing loan borrowing costs

Risk-based pricing is a practice in which companies charge customers higher prices based on their risk profile. It is a prevalent practice among insurers, as well as lenders in the mortgage and financial services industries. Historically, lenders and insurers tended to price through "risk-spreading", but have increasingly over time resorted to risk-based pricing. It has been in use for many years as lenders try to measure loan risk in terms of interest rates and other fees. The interest rate on a loan is determined not only by the time value of money, but also by the lender's estimate of the probability that the borrower will default on the loan. A borrower who the lender thinks is less likely to default will be offered a better (lower) interest rate. This means that different borrowers will pay different rates.

The lender may consider a variety of factors in assessing the probability of default. These factors might be characteristics of the individual borrower, like the borrower's credit score or employment status. These factors might also be characteristics of the loan; for example, a mortgage lender might offer different rates to the same borrower, depending on whether that borrower wished to buy a single-family house or a condominium.

Concerns have been raised about the extent to which risk-based pricing increases borrowing costs for the poor, who are generally more likely to default, and thereby further increases their likelihood of default. Supporters also argue that risk-based pricing expands access to credit for high-risk borrowers (who are often lower-income), by allowing lenders to price this increased risk into the loan.

== Risk factors ==
Common risk factors for individuals include credit score and history, property use, property type, loan amount, loan purpose, income, and asset amounts, as well as documentation levels, property location, and others (employment details, designation, etc.). Lenders 'price' loans according to these individual factors and their multiple derivatives. Each derivative either positively or negatively affects the cost of an interest rate. For example, lower credit scores equal higher interest rates and vice versa; typically, those who provide less verifiable income documentation due to self-employment benefits will qualify for a higher interest rate than someone who fully documents all reported income. Mortgage and other financial service industries value credit score and history most when pricing mortgage interest rates.

== Property types ==
Pertaining to residential mortgages and their risk based pricing methods, the Property Type is sub-categorized as follows:

- Single Family Residence (SFR)
- Multi-Family 2-4 Units (MF)
- Townhome/Condominium (TC)

SFRs are considered to have the highest dollar value per square foot and are thus the most favorably priced of the property types in the eyes of the lending institution. The property is stand alone, or 'detached' from other property.

Multi-family and townhome/condominiums are typically 'negatively priced', where the lender will assess a .5% to .75% increase in the actual interest rate or the price of an interest rate, due to their relative lower dollar per square foot values.

== Property use ==
Pertaining to residential mortgages and their risk based pricing methods the property use can be sub-categorized as follows:

- Primary residence
- Second home
- Non-owner occupied or investment property

A primary residence is viewed and priced as the lowest risk factor of Property Use. There are no adjustments to pricing or rate.

A second home is viewed and priced according to lender, some will assess the same risk factor as a primary residence while others will factor in a 0.125% to 0.5% pricing increase to mitigate the perceived risk. Lenders perceive that the borrower is less likely to value the second home if the borrower was faced with financial difficulties.

A non-owner occupied property is viewed and priced as the highest risk factor of property use. Lenders will factor in a 0.5% to 2.5% pricing increase to mitigate the perceived risk.

== Criticism ==
The main criticism among mainstream consumers has been that risk-based pricing can make 'shopping' for the best interest rates much more difficult. It is almost impossible to tell at first glance if one can be qualified to get an advertised rate or exactly what interest rate they qualify for at all. Consumer-rights advocates also believe that risk-based pricing in the extreme, especially in the form of predatory lending, hurts financially disadvantaged and vulnerable consumers by cutting them off from reasonably affordable capital and exposing them unwittingly to soaring interest rates and unsustainable financing schemes that erode equity and may lead to default. Risk-based pricing can be manipulated to wield deceptive marketing practices, such as the bait and switch. The fairness of similar lending practices within the mortgage industry is being investigated by the United States Congress.

== See also ==
- Risk premium
- Rational pricing § Risk neutral pricing
