= Microsoft Customer Care Framework =

Desktop-based framework

- A possible implementation of CCF Agent Desktop
- Developer: Microsoft
- Final release: 2009 SP 1 / March 31, 2009
- Operating system: Microsoft Windows
- Platform: .NET Framework
- Type: Utility software
- License: Proprietary software
- Website: microsoft.com

Microsoft Customer Care Framework (CCF) was a desktop-based framework which was used to address issues faced by service providers caused by multiple line of business (LOB) systems while interacting with their customers. It was discontinued though many of its core functions were moved to an add-in for the Microsoft Dynamics CRM product named the Unified Service Desk.

The Customer Care Framework provided a core set of functions for customer support avenues including voice call via call center agents and Internet portals. The framework used other Microsoft server products including the BizTalk Server, and SharePoint. CCF required the use of Microsoft SQL Server and Microsoft IIS for the server side, which it uses to provide a base core set of web services.

CCF is targeted at medium to large enterprises. CCF was originally developed for the large call center requirements of the telecommunication industry.

CCF is different from most products from Microsoft in that it is not an 'out of the box' solution but requires development and configuration to build a working customer solution. The framework allows for a SOA methodology on development on the server and agent desktop side, but this is not mandatory and non-SOA development can be done and is normally the case.

== CCF Components ==
=== Agent Desktop ===
The primary user interface for CCF is the agent desktop. This is a desktop-based user interface (UI) that presents data aggregated from various Line of business (LOB) & OSS/BSS application front ends and presents them in a unified view. CCF does not include an Agent Desktop application, rather samples including source code are provided as part of the framework.

=== Application Integration Framework (AIF) ===
The AIF manages the loading of the applications, integration and event brokering. Through the use of adapters (see HAT below) applications can have custom integrations to account for both the technology of the hosted application as well as business processing.

=== Hosted Application Toolkit (HAT) ===
HAT allows for the separation of the business rules and the method used to integrate with the application. HAT uses Microsoft Windows Workflow Foundation (WF) to manage the business rules, Data Driven Adapters (DDAs) to manage the application directly, and Bindings written in XML to connect the two. CCF 2009 SP1 ships with 3 DDAs: Win32, Web, and Java (JDK 1.6). DDAs can be customized or extended for additional application types as needed.

== Releases ==
- Customer Care Framework 1.0: released early 2003
- Customer Care Framework 1.1: released 2004; uses .NET Framework 1.1
- Customer Care Framework 1.2: released 2004; uses .NET Framework 1.1
- Customer Care Framework 2.0: released 2005; uses .NET Framework 1.1
- Customer Care Framework 2005 (version 2.5.0): released Jan 2006, uses .NET Framework 1.1
- Customer Care Framework 2005 (QFE 1, version 2.5.1): released April 2006, uses .NET Framework 1.1
- Customer Care Framework 2005 (QFE 2, version 2.5.2): released 2006, uses .NET Framework 1.1
- Customer Care Framework 2005 (QFE 3, version 2.5.3): released August 2006, uses .NET Framework 1.1
- Customer Care Framework 2005 for .NET Framework 2.0 (version 2.6): built on a modified 2.5.3 base; requires .NET Framework 2.0. Contains significant bug fixes to those base areas of CCF where the code is not available.
- Customer Care Framework 2008: released 21 September 2007, uses .NET Framework 3.0
- Customer Care Framework 2009: released 28 October 2008.
- Customer Care Framework 2009 Service Pack 1: released April 2009.
- Customer Care Framework 2009 Service Pack 1 QFE: released August 2009, adds support for .NET Framework 3.5 SP1, IE8, dynamic positioning. Adds a shell API, which (amongst others) brings improved CTI support and possibility to develop WPF shells.

Any version of Customer Care Framework before CCF 2009 SP1 QFE will break when upgrading to .NET Framework 3.5 SP1.

== Similar Products ==
Microsoft's Composite UI Application Block can be used to build composite applications within CCF, and a number of products similar to CCF are offered by other companies as well.
