= Current Expected Credit Losses =

US accounting standard

Current Expected Credit Losses (CECL) is a credit loss accounting standard (model) that was issued by the Financial Accounting Standards Board (FASB) on June 16, 2016. CECL replaced the previous Allowance for Loan and Lease Losses (ALLL) accounting standard. The CECL standard focuses on estimation of expected losses over the life of the loans, while the prior standard relied on incurred losses.

== Background ==
The 2008 financial crisis demonstrated that the then Allowance for Loan and Lease Losses (ALLL) accounting standard/framework did not allow for timely adjustment of reserve levels based on reasonable expectation of future conditions. It relied on losses that were incurred but not realized, i.e., when it was known with some expectation that future cash flows would not be collected. During the crisis, negative outlook of the economy was not explicitly taken into account for ALLL calculations. As a result, reserves were not adjusted for future expected losses. The FASB reviewed the standard and replaced it with CECL. CECL requires expected losses to be estimated over the remaining life of the loans, as opposed to incurred losses of the then-current standard.

FASB stated that the new standard would improve “financial reporting by requiring timelier recording of credit losses on loans and other financial instruments held by financial institutions and other organizations.” The Office of the Comptroller of the Currency (OCC) and Federal Reserve predicted that industry allowances would go up by 30% to 50%.

== CECL impact ==
Prior to implementation, CECL was expected to have a substantial impact on multiple financial institutions.

- Larger allowances may have been required for most products. It was argued that this effect alone could have changed the structure of products to scale down the impact.
- As allowances may have increased, pricing of the products may change to reflect higher capital cost.
- Losses modeling would have changed. This would impact both data collection (data need to be more granular) and modeling methodology (backward-looking over a short period of time to forward-looking for the life of the loan).

Companies that adopted CECL in 2020 also dealt with the impacts of COVID-19 which complicated the adoption.

== CECL criticism ==
The Bank Policy Institute points out that CECL forces banks to recognize expected future losses immediately but does not allow them to recognize immediately the higher expected future interest earnings banks receive as compensation for risk. This could result in a decrease in availability of lending to non-prime borrowers, stunting economic recovery following a downturn.

Another criticism regarding CECL is that in order to estimate expected credit losses, banks are required to forecast the state of the economy. As noted by the American Bankers Association (ABA), “Forecasting is difficult, even for the experts… forecasting organizations largely missed forecasting the financial crisis and openly admit the difficulty in forecasting turns in the economic cycle.” Additionally, CECL was implemented primarily to force banks to maintain countercyclical reserves. Per the American Banker, all thorough analyses of the effect of the new rules have shown, to differing degrees, that allowances will continue to be procyclical after CECL comes into force during 2020.
