= H. Scott Bierman =

American economist

Harold Scott Bierman (born c. 1955) is an economist, author, and was from 2009 to 2023 president of Beloit College in Beloit, Wisconsin.

Bierman graduated from Bates College in Maine in 1977 with a B.A. in mathematics and economics and then received a Ph.D. in economics from the University of Virginia. While serving as a professor at Carleton College in Minnesota for 27 years, he also served as academic dean, chair of the economics department, and faculty president. Bierman has authored several books and written extensively on a wide range of topics, particularly game theory, public sector, experimental economics and industrial organization. In 2009, Bierman became the 11th president of Beloit College in Wisconsin. He also serves on the board of trustees at Bates College.

He joined the Carleton faculty in 1982 and was named chair of the economics department in 1991. From 1997 to 2000, he was faculty president, serving as liaison between faculty and the dean and president on curricular and personnel issues. He also founded and chaired the Carleton Faculty Council.
