= Structured trade and commodity finance =

International financial transactions are based on several financing philosophies, whose application is affected by the course of economic growth and development within an individual national economy. This is demonstrated by the evolution of the financing technique known as International structured trade & commodity finance (STCF).

STCF is "cross-border trade finance in emerging markets where the intention is to get repaid by the liquidation of a flow of commodities."

== Modular system ==
To better understand the various STCF financing constructions and techniques, which are to be found with greater frequency in actual financing situations, a STCF modular system can be used. The STCF modular system consists in several levels, which identify the typical stages of each STCF transaction: a pre-export financing, a warehouse and transport financing, a tolling financing and an accounts receivables financing.

When considering a STCF financing technique, in addition to defining and categorizing the commodity type and its trading practices, a detailed analysis of the specific risks involved, including the allocation of risk and the mitigation and avoidance of such risk, as these risks might be specifically applicable and appropriate to STCF financing techniques and transactions, shall be considered.

== Aspects of risk ==
The concentration on all aspects of risk leads to the specific STCF relevant risk themes, such as performance risk analysis, commodity hedging as well as collateral evaluation, assessment and development of an appropriate risk early warning system.
