= Richard Rogalski =

American economist

Richard Rogalski is an American economist, currently the George J. Records Professor at Tuck School of Business, Dartmouth College.
