= Debt service ratio =

In economics and government finance, a country’s debt service ratio is the ratio of its debt service payments (principal + interest) to its export earnings. A country's international finances are healthier when this ratio is low. For most countries the ratio is between 0 and 20%.

In contrast to the debt service coverage ratio, which is calculated as income divided by debt, this ratio is inverse and calculated as debt service divided by country's income from international trade, i.e., exports.
