= Expected loss =

Calculation of financial risk

Expected loss is the sum of the values of all possible losses, each multiplied by the probability of that loss occurring.

In bank lending (homes, autos, credit cards, commercial lending, etc.) the expected loss on a loan varies over time for a number of reasons. Most loans are repaid over time and therefore have a declining outstanding amount to be repaid. Additionally, loans are typically backed up by pledged collateral whose value changes differently over time vs. the outstanding loan value.

Three factors are relevant in analyzing expected loss:

- Probability of default (PD)
- Exposure at default (EAD)
- Loss given default (LGD)

== Simple example ==
- Original home value $100, loan to value 80%, loan amount $80
  - outstanding loan $75
  - current home value $70
  - liquidation cost $10
- Loss given default = Magnitude of likely loss on the exposure / Exposure at default
  - -$75 loan receivable write off Exposure at default
  - +$70 house sold
  - -$10 liquidation cost paid =
  - -$15 currency loss
  - Expressed as a %
  - -15/75 =
  - 20% Loss given default
- Probability of default
  - Since there is negative equity 50 homeowners out of 100 will "toss the keys to the bank and walk away", therefore:
  - 50% probability of default
- Expected loss
  - in %
    - 20% x 50% =10%
  - in currency
    - currency loss x probability
    - $15 * 50% = $7.5
  - check
    - loss given default * probability of default * Exposure at default
    - 20% * 50% * $75 = $7.5

== Recalculating expected loss ==
Expected loss is not time-invariant, but rather needs to be recalculated when circumstances change. Sometimes both the probability of default and the loss given default can both rise, giving two reasons that the expected loss increases.

For example, over a 20-year period only 5% of a certain class of homeowners default. However, when a systemic crisis hits, and home values drop 30% for a long period, that same class of borrowers changes their default behavior. Instead of 5% defaulting, say 10% default, largely due to the fact the LGD has catastrophically risen.

To accommodate for that type of situation a much larger expected loss needs to be calculated. This is the subject to considerable research at the national and global levels as it has a large impact on the understanding and mitigation of systemic risk.

== See also ==
- Systemic risk
- Loss function
  - Loss function § Expected loss
- Potential future exposure
- Credit valuation adjustment
