= Jarrow–Turnbull model =

Reduced-form model for valuing credit-risky securities using default intensities

The Jarrow–Turnbull model is a widely used "reduced-form" credit risk model. It was published in 1995 by Robert A. Jarrow and Stuart Turnbull. Under the model, which returns the corporate's probability of default, bankruptcy is modeled as a statistical process. The model extends the reduced-form model of Merton (1976) to a random interest rates framework.

Reduced-form models are an approach to credit risk modeling that contrasts sharply with "structural credit models", the best known of which is the Merton model of 1974. Reduced-form models focus on modeling the probability of default as a statistical process, whereas structural-models inhere a microeconomic model of the firm's capital structure, deriving the (single-period) probability of default from the random variation in the (unobservable) value of the firm's assets. Large financial institutions employ default models of both the structural and reduced-form types.

== See also ==
- Credit default swap
- Credit derivatives
- Credit risk
- Merton model
- Probability of default
