= Import ratio =

Import ratio, in economics and government finance, is the ratio of total imports of a country to that country’s total foreign exchange (FX) reserves. The ratio can be inverted and is referred to as the reserves to imports ratio. This ratio divides a country's average foreign exchange reserve by a country's average monthly level of imports.

== Relation to sovereign risk ==
Credit restructuring is made more likely by a higher amount of imports relative to FX reserves. A less developed country will pay for imports with its foreign exchange reserves. The more it imports, the faster these reserves are used up. Since satisfying a country's needs is considered more important than repaying foreign creditors the more a country imports relative to its foreign exchange reserves the greater the probability of debt rescheduling.
