= Loan purpose =

Underlying reason an applicant seeks a loan or mortgage

In the United States, loan purpose is the underlying reason an applicant seeks a loan or mortgage. Lenders use loan purpose to make decisions on the risk and what interest rate to offer. For example, if an applicant is refinancing a mortgage after having taken cash out, the lender might consider that an increase in risk and increase the interest rate that is offered or add additional conditions. Loan purpose is important to the process of obtaining mortgages or business loans that are connected with specific types of business activities.

Pertaining to mortgages and their risk based pricing factors, the loan purpose factor is sub-categorized by purchase, rate and term refinance and cash-out refinance. Lenders assess that a purchase loan contains the least risk and thus 'price' purchase loans most favorably (i.e. no interest rate increase or a risk-based pricing improvement in the order of .25%).

Rate and term refinances are priced similar to purchase loans, with no interest rate increase. Cash received by the borrower at closing may not exceed $2000 to maintain rate and term status. The purpose is, as the name implies, to reduce the interest rate, payment, and/or overall term of the mortgage.

Cash-out refinances are deemed to have a higher risk factor than either rate & term refinances or purchases due to the increase in loan amount relative to the value of the property. Risk-based pricing typically mandates a .25% to .5% increase in interest rate if a borrower needs to draw equity out of the subject property.

== See also ==
- Pre-qualification
