= Risk-weighted asset =

Regulatory capital

Risk-weighted asset (RWA) is a bank's assets which includes retained tranches or off-balance-sheet exposures, weighted according to risk. This sort of asset calculation is used in determining the capital requirement or Capital Adequacy Ratio (CAR) for a financial institution. In the Basel I accord published by the Basel Committee on Banking Supervision, the Committee explains why using a risk-weight approach is the preferred methodology which banks should adopt for capital calculation:

- it provides an easier approach to compare banks across different geographies
- off-balance-sheet exposures can be easily included in capital adequacy calculations
- banks are not deterred from carrying low risk liquid assets in their books

Usually, different classes of assets have different risk weights associated with them. The calculation of risk weights is dependent on whether the bank has adopted the standardized or IRB approach under the Basel II framework.

Some assets, such as debentures, are assigned a higher risk than others, such as cash or government securities/bonds. Since different types of assets have different risk profiles, weighting assets according to their level of risk primarily adjusts for assets that are less risky by allowing banks to discount lower-risk assets. In the most basic application, government debt is allowed a 0% "risk weighting" - that is, they are subtracted from total assets for purposes of calculating the CAR.

A document was written in 1988 by the Basel Committee on Banking Supervision which recommends certain standards and regulations for banks. This was called Basel I, and the Committee came out with a revised framework known as Basel II. The main recommendation of this document is that banks should hold enough capital to equal at least 8% of its risk-weighted assets. More recently, the committee has published another revised framework known as Basel III. The calculation of the amount of risk-weighted assets depends on which revision of the Basel Accord is being followed by the financial institution. Most countries have implemented some version of this regulation.

== Example ==
For an example of how risk-weighted assets are calculated and derivation of capital ratio, see

== See also ==
- Basel Accords
- Basel I
- Basel II
- Basel III
- Asset quality
