= Loss given default =

Share of an asset

Loss given default (LGD) is the share of an asset that is lost if a borrower defaults.

It is a common parameter in risk models and also a parameter used in the calculation of economic capital, expected loss or regulatory capital under Basel II for a banking institution. This is an attribute of any exposure on bank's client. Exposure is the amount that one may lose in an investment.

The LGD is closely linked to the expected loss, which is defined as the product of the LGD, the probability of default (PD) and the exposure at default (EAD).

== Definition ==
LGD is the share of an asset that is lost when a borrower defaults. The recovery rate is defined as 1 minus the LGD, the share of an asset that is recovered when a borrower defaults.

Loss given default is facility-specific because such losses are generally understood to be influenced by key transaction characteristics such as the presence of collateral and the degree of subordination.

== How to calculate LGD ==
The LGD calculation is easily understood with the help of an example: If the client defaults with an outstanding debt of $100,000 and the bank or insurance is able to sell the security (e.g. a condo) for a net price of $80,000 (including costs related to the repurchase), then the loss amount is $20,000, and the LGD is 20% (= $20,000 / $100,000).

Theoretically, LGD is calculated in different ways, but the most popular is 'gross' LGD, where total losses are divided by exposure at default (EAD). Another method is to divide losses by the unsecured portion of a credit line (where security covers a portion of EAD). This is known as 'Blanco' LGD. (Note: Named after academic Roberto Blanco) If collateral value is zero in the last case then Blanco LGD is equivalent to gross LGD. Different types of statistical methods can be used to do this.

Gross LGD is most popular amongst academics because of its simplicity and because academics only have access to bond market data, where collateral values often are unknown, uncalculated or irrelevant. Blanco LGD is popular amongst some practitioners (banks) because banks often have many secured facilities, and banks would like to decompose their losses between losses on unsecured portions and losses on secured portions due to depreciation of collateral quality. The latter calculation is also a subtle requirement of Basel II, but most banks are not sophisticated enough at this time to make those types of calculations.

=== Calculating LGD under the foundation approach (for corporate, sovereign and bank exposure) ===
To determine required capital for a bank or financial institution under Basel II, the institution has to calculate risk-weighted assets. This requires estimating the LGD for each corporate, sovereign and bank exposure. There are two approaches for deriving this estimate: a foundation approach and an advanced approach.

==== Exposure without collateral ====
Under the foundation approach, BIS prescribes fixed LGD ratios for certain classes of unsecured exposures:

- Senior claims on corporates, sovereigns and banks not secured by recognized collateral attract a 45% LGD.
- All subordinated claims on corporates, sovereigns and banks attract a 75% LGD.

==== Exposure with collateral ====
Simple LGD example: If the client defaults, with an outstanding debt of 200,000 (EAD) and the bank is able to sell the security for a net price of 160,000 (including costs related to the repurchase), then 40,000, or 20%, of the EAD are lost - the LGD is 20%.

The effective loss given default ($L_{GD}^*$) applicable to a collateralized transaction can be expressed as

$L_{GD}^* = L_{GD}\cdot\frac{E^*}{E}$

Haircut appropriate for currency mismatch between the collateral and exposure (The standard supervisory haircut for currency risk where exposure and collateral are denominated in different currencies is 8%)

The *He and *Hc has to be derived from the following table of standard supervisory haircuts:

However, under certain special circumstances the supervisors, i.e. the local central banks may choose not to apply the haircuts specified under the comprehensive approach, but instead to apply a zero H.

=== Calculating LGD under the advanced approach (and for the retail-portfolio under the foundation approach) ===
Under the A-IRB approach and for the retail-portfolio under the F-IRB approach, the bank itself determines the appropriate loss given default to be applied to each exposure, on the basis of robust data and analysis. The analysis must be capable of being validated both internally and by supervisors. Thus, a bank using internal loss given default estimates for capital purposes might be able to differentiate loss given default values on the basis of a wider set of transaction characteristics (e.g. product type, wider range of collateral types) as well as borrower characteristics. These values would be expected to represent a conservative view of long-run averages. A bank wishing to use its own estimates of LGD will need to demonstrate to its supervisor that it can meet additional minimum requirements pertinent to the integrity and reliability of these estimates.

An LGD model assesses the value and/or the quality of a security the bank holds for providing the loan – securities can be either machinery like cars, trucks or construction machines. It can be mortgages or it can be a custody account or a commodity. The higher the value of the security the lower the LGD and thus the potential loss the bank or insurance faces in the case of a default. Banks using the A-IRB approach have to determine LGD values, whereas banks within the F-IRB do only have to do so for the retail-portfolio. For example, as of 2013, there were nine companies in the United Kingdom with their own mortgage LGD models. In Switzerland there were two banks as of 2013. In Germany many thrifts – especially the market leader Bausparkasse Schwäbisch Hall – have their own mortgage LGD models. In the corporate asset class many German banks still only use the values given by the regulator under the F-IRB approach.

Repurchase value estimators (RVEs) have proven to be the best kind of tools for LGD estimates. The repurchase value ratio provides the percentage of the value of the house/apartment (mortgages) or machinery at a given time compared to its purchase price.

== Downturn LGD ==
Under Basel II, banks and other financial institutions are recommended to calculate 'downturn LGD' (downturn loss given default), which reflects the losses occurring during a 'downturn' in a business cycle for regulatory purposes. Downturn LGD is interpreted in many ways, and most financial institutions that are applying for IRB approval under BIS II often have differing definitions of what Downturn conditions are. One definition is at least two consecutive quarters of negative growth in real GDP. Often, negative growth is also accompanied by a negative output gap in an economy (where potential production exceeds actual demand).

The calculation of LGD (or downturn LGD) poses significant challenges to modelers and practitioners. Final resolutions of defaults can take many years and final losses, and hence final LGD, cannot be calculated until all of this information is ripe. Furthermore, practitioners are of want of data since BIS II implementation is rather new and financial institutions may have only just started collecting the information necessary for calculating the individual elements that LGD is composed of: EAD, direct and indirect Losses, security values and potential, expected future recoveries. Another challenge, and maybe the most significant, is the fact that the default definitions between institutions vary. This often results in a so-called differing cure-rates or percentage of defaults without losses. Calculation of LGD (average) is often composed of defaults with losses and defaults without. Naturally, when more defaults without losses are added to a sample pool of observations LGD becomes lower. This is often the case when default definitions become more 'sensitive' to credit deterioration or 'early' signs of defaults. When institutions use different definitions, LGD parameters therefore become non-comparable.

Many institutions are scrambling to produce estimates of downturn LGD, but often resort to 'mapping' since downturn data is often lacking. Mapping is the process of guesstimating losses under a downturn by taking existing LGD and adding a supplement or buffer, which is supposed to represent a potential increase in LGD when a downturn occurs. LGD often decreases for some segments during a downturn since there is a relatively larger increase of defaults that result in higher cure-rates, often the result of temporary credit deterioration that disappears after the downturn period is over. Furthermore, LGD values decrease for defaulting financial institutions under economic downturns because governments and central banks often rescue these institutions in order to maintain financial stability.

In 2010 researchers at Moody's Analytics quantify an LGD in line with the target probability event intended to be captured under Basel. They illustrate that the Basel downturn LGD guidelines may not be sufficiently conservative. Their results are based on a structural model that incorporates systematic risk in recovery.

== Correcting for different default definitions ==
One problem facing practitioners is the comparison of LGD estimates (usually averages) arising from different time periods where differing default definitions have been in place. The following formula can be used to compare LGD estimates from one time period (say x) with another time period (say y):

LGD_{y}=LGD_{x}*(1-Cure Rate_{y})/(1-Cure Rate_{x})

== Country-specific LGD ==
In Australia, the prudential regulator APRA has set an interim minimum downturn LGD of 20 per cent on residential mortgages for all applicants for the advanced Basel II approaches. The 20 per cent floor is not risk sensitive and is designed to encourage authorised deposit-taking institutions (ADIs) to undertake further work, which APRA believes would be closer to the 20 per cent on average than ADIs’ original estimates.

== Importance ==
LGD warrants more attention than it has been given in the past decade, where credit risk models often assumed that LGD was time-invariant. Movements in LGD often result in proportional movements in required economic capital. According to BIS (2006) institutions implementing Advanced-IRB instead of Foundation-IRB will experience larger decreases in Tier 1 capital, and the internal calculation of LGD is a factor separating the two Methods.
