= Exposure at default =

Potential loss due to a failed bank loan

Exposure at default (EAD) is a parameter used in the calculation of economic capital or regulatory capital under Basel II for a banking institution. It can be defined as the gross exposure under a facility upon default of an obligor.

Outside of Basel II, the concept is sometimes known as credit exposure (CE). It represents the immediate loss that the lender would suffer if the borrower (counterparty) fully defaults on its debt.

The EAD is closely linked to the expected loss, which is defined as the product of the EAD, the probability of default (PD) and the loss given default (LGD).

== Definition ==
In general, EAD is seen as an estimation of the extent to which a bank may be exposed to a counterparty in the event of, and at the time of, that counterparty’s default. EAD is equal to the current amount outstanding in case of fixed exposures such as term loans. For revolving exposures like lines of credit, EAD can be divided into drawn and undrawn commitments; typically the drawn commitment is known whereas the undrawn commitment needs to be estimated to arrive at a value of EAD. Based on Basel Guidelines, EAD for commitments measures the amount of the facility that is likely to be drawn further if a default occurs. Two popular terms used to express the percentage of the undrawn commitment that will be drawn and outstanding at default (in case of a default) are Conversion Factor (CF) and Loan Equivalent (LEQ).

== Calculation ==
Calculation of EAD is different under foundation and advanced approach. While under foundation approach (F-IRB) calculation of EAD is guided by the regulators, under the advanced approach (A-IRB) banks enjoy greater flexibility on how they calculate EAD.

=== Foundation approach ===
Under F-IRB, EAD is calculated taking account of the underlying asset, forward valuation, facility type and commitment details. This value does not take account of guarantees, collateral or security (i.e. ignores Credit Risk Mitigation Techniques with the exception of on-balance sheet netting where the effect of netting is included in Exposure At Default). For on-balance sheet transactions, EAD is identical to the nominal amount of exposure. On-balance sheet netting of loans and deposits of a bank to a corporate counterparty is permitted to reduce the estimate of EAD under certain conditions. For off-balance sheet items, there are two broad types which the IRB approach needs to address: transactions with uncertain future drawdown, such as commitments and revolving credits, and OTC foreign exchange, interest rate and equity derivative contracts.

=== Advanced approach ===
Under A-IRB, the bank itself determines how the appropriate EAD is to be applied to each exposure. A bank using internal EAD estimates for capital purposes might be able to differentiate EAD values on the basis of a wider set of transaction characteristics (e.g. product type) as well as borrower characteristics. These values would be expected to represent a conservative view of long-run averages, although banks would be free to use more conservative estimates. A bank wishing to use its own estimates of EAD will need to demonstrate to its supervisor that it can meet additional minimum requirements pertinent to the integrity and reliability of these estimates. All estimates of EAD should be calculated net of any specific provisions a bank may have raised against an exposure.

== Importance ==
For a risk weight derived from the IRB framework to be transformed into a risk weighted asset, it needs to be attached to an exposure amount. Any error in EAD calculation will directly affect the risk weighted asset and thereby affect the capital requirement.
