= Probability of default =

Financial term

Probability of default (PD) is a financial term describing the likelihood of a default over a particular time horizon. It provides an estimate of the likelihood that a borrower will be unable to meet its debt obligations.

PD is used in a variety of credit analyses and risk management frameworks. Under Basel II, it is a key parameter used in the calculation of economic capital or regulatory capital for a banking institution.

PD is closely linked to the expected loss, which is defined as the product of the PD, the loss given default (LGD) and the exposure at default (EAD).

== Overview ==
PD is the risk that the borrower will be unable or unwilling to repay its debt in full or on time. The risk of default is derived by analyzing the obligor's capacity to repay the debt in accordance with contractual terms. PD is generally associated with financial characteristics such as inadequate cash flow to service debt, declining revenues or operating margins, high leverage, declining or marginal liquidity, and the inability to successfully implement a business plan. In addition to these quantifiable factors, the borrower's willingness to repay also must be evaluated.

— [Office of the Comptroller of the Currency]

The probability of default is an estimate of the likelihood that the default event will occur. It applies to a particular assessment horizon, usually one year.

Credit scores, such as FICO for consumers or bond ratings from S&P, Fitch or Moodys for corporations or governments, typically imply a certain probability of default.

For group of obligors sharing similar credit risk characteristics such as a RMBS or pool of loans, a PD may be derived for a group of assets that is representative of the typical (average) obligor of the group. In comparison, a PD for a bond or commercial loan, are typically determined for a single entity.

Under Basel II, a default event on a debt obligation is said to have occurred if

- it is unlikely that the obligor will be able to repay its debt to the bank without giving up any pledged collateral
- the obligor is more than 90 days past due on a material credit obligation

== Stressed and unstressed PD ==
The PD of an obligor not only depends on the risk characteristics of that particular obligor but also the economic environment and the degree to which it affects the obligor. Thus, the information available to estimate PD can be divided into two broad categories -

- Macroeconomic information like house price indices, unemployment, GDP growth rates, etc. - this information remains the same for multiple obligors.
- Obligor specific information like revenue growth (wholesale), number of times delinquent in the past six months (retail), etc. - this information is specific to a single obligor and can be either static or dynamic in nature. Examples of static characteristics are industry for wholesale loans and origination "loan to value ratio" for retail loans.

An unstressed PD is an estimate that the obligor will default over a particular time horizon considering the current macroeconomic as well as obligor specific information. This implies that if the macroeconomic conditions deteriorate, the PD of an obligor will tend to increase while it will tend to decrease if economic conditions improve.

A stressed PD is an estimate that the obligor will default over a particular time horizon considering the current obligor specific information, but considering "stressed" macroeconomic factors irrespective of the current state of the economy. The stressed PD of an obligor changes over time depending on the risk characteristics of the obligor, but is not heavily affected by changes in the economic cycle as adverse economic conditions are already factored into the estimate.

For a more detailed conceptual explanation of stressed and unstressed PD, refer.

== Through-the-cycle (TTC) and point-in-time (PIT) ==
Closely related to the concept of stressed and unstressed PD's, the terms through-the-cycle (TTC) or point-in-time (PIT) can be used both in the context of PD as well as rating system. In the context of PD, the stressed PD defined above usually denotes the TTC PD of an obligor whereas the unstressed PD denotes the PIT PD. In the context of rating systems, a PIT rating system assigns each obligor to a bucket such that all obligors in a bucket share similar unstressed PDs while all obligors in a risk bucket assigned by a TTC rating system share similar stressed PDs.

Credit default swap-implied (CDS-implied) probabilities of default are based upon the market prices of credit default swaps. Like equity prices, their prices contain all information available to the market as a whole. As such, the probability of default can be inferred by the price.

CDS provide risk-neutral probabilities of default, which may overestimate the real world probability of default unless risk premiums are somehow taken into account. One option is to use CDS implied PD's in conjunction with EDF (Expected Default Frequency) credit measures.

== Deriving point-in-time and through-the-cycle PDs ==
There are alternative approaches for deriving and estimating PIT and TTC PDs. One such framework involves distinguishing PIT and TTC PDs by means of systematic predictable fluctuations in credit conditions, i.e. by means of a “credit cycle”. This framework, involving the selective use of either PIT or TTC PDs for different purposes, has been successfully implemented in large UK banks with BASEL II AIRB status.

As a first step this framework makes use of Merton approach in which leverage and volatility (or their proxies) are used to create a PD model.

As a second step, this framework assumes existence of systematic factor(s) similar to Asymptotic Risk Factor Model (ASRF).

As a third step, this framework makes use of predictability of credit cycles. This means that if the default rate in a sector is near historic high then one would assume it to fall and if the default rate in a sector is near historic low then one would assume it to rise. In contrast to other approaches which assumes the systematic factor to be completely random, this framework quantifies the predictable component of the systematic factor which results in more accurate prediction of default rates.

As per this framework, the term PIT applies to PDs that move over time in tandem with realized, default rates (DRs), increasing as general credit conditions deteriorate and decreasing as conditions improve. The term TTC applies to PDs that exhibit no such fluctuations, remaining fixed overall even as general credit conditions wax and wane. The TTC PDs of different entities will change, but the overall average across all entities won't. The greater accuracy of PIT PDs makes them the preferred choice in such current, risk applications as pricing or portfolio management. The overall stability of TTC PDs makes them attractive in such applications as determining Basel II/II RWA.

The above framework provides a method to quantify credit cycles, their systematic and random components and resulting PIT and TTC PDs. This is accomplished for wholesale credit by summarizing, for each of several industries or regions, MKMV EDFs, Kamakura Default Probabilities (KDPs), or some other, comprehensive set of PIT PDs or DRs. After that, one transforms these factors into convenient units and expressed them as deviations from their respective, long-run-average values. The unit transformation typically involves the application of the inverse-normal distribution function, thereby converting measures of median or average PDs into measures of median or average “default distance” (DD). At this point, one has a set of indices measuring the distance between current and long-run-average DD in each of a selected set of sectors. Depending on data availability and portfolio requirements, such indices can be created for various industries and regions with 20+ years covering multiple recessions.

After developing these indices, one can calculate both PIT and TTC PDs for counterparties within each of the covered sectors. To obtain PIT PDs, one introduces the relevant indices into the relevant default models, re-calibrate the models to defaults, and apply the models with current and projected changes in indices as inputs. If a PD model weren't otherwise PIT, the introduction of the indices will make it PIT. The specific model formulation depends on the features important to each, distinguished class of counterparties and data constraints. Some common approaches include:

- Factor Ratio Model: Calibration of financial/non-financial factors and credit-cycle indices to defaults. This approach works well with large number of defaults, e.g. SME portfolios or large-corporate portfolios calibrated to external default samples.
- Scorecard model: Calibration of score and credit-cycle indices calibrated to observed internal or external defaults. This approach works with smaller number of defaults where there is not enough data to develop a ratio model. E.g. Funds portfolio
- Agency Direct model: Calibration of ECAI grades (enumerated as default distance) and credit indices to ECAI defaults and applying it to Agency and internal co-rated entities. This approach works well where there is a large co-rated dataset but not enough internal defaults e.g. Insurance portfolio
- Agency Replication model: Calibrate financial/non-financial factors/scorecard score to PDs estimated from the Agency Direct model. This approach works well where there is a large, co-rated dataset but a small sample of internal defaults—e.g. Insurance portfolio
- External vendor model: Use of models such as MKMV EDF model with credit cycle indices.

At this point, to determine a TTC PD, one follows three steps:

- Converting the PIT PD to PIT DD
- Subtracting the credit cycle index from the PIT DD, thereby obtaining the TTC DD; and
- Converting the TTC DD to TTC PD.

In addition to PD models, this framework can also be used to develop PIT and TTC variants of LGD, EAD and Stress Testing models.

Most PD models output PDs that are of a hybrid nature: they are neither perfectly Point-In-Time (PIT) nor through-the-cycle (TTC). The long-run average of Observed Default Frequency ODF is often regarded as a TTC PD. It is argued that when considered over a long period, the systematic effects averages close to zero. However, defining the appropriate period of reference for calculating such an average is often challenging, e.g. multiple business cycles in the historical data can over or underestimate the average PD which is considered a biased estimate. Furthermore, the assumption of a constant TTC PD for a pool of obligors is not realistic in practice. In fact, idiosyncratic risk of a portfolio can vary over time. A classic example is changes in the distribution of the portfolio due to in- and out-flows of the obligors but also due to decisions taken by the bank, such as modifications of lending conditions or policies.

== Estimation ==
There are many alternatives for estimating the probability of default. Default probabilities may be estimated from a historical data base of actual defaults using modern techniques like logistic regression. Default probabilities may also be estimated from the observable prices of credit default swaps, bonds, and options on common stock. The simplest approach, taken by many banks, is to use external ratings agencies such as S&P Global Ratings, Fitch or Moody's Investors Service for estimating PDs from historical default experience. For small business default probability estimation, logistic regression is again the most common technique for estimating the drivers of default for a small business based on a historical data base of defaults. These models are both developed internally and supplied by third parties. A similar approach is taken to retail default, using the term "credit score" as a euphemism for the default probability which is the true focus of the lender.

Some of the popular statistical methods which have been used to model probability of default are listed below.

- Linear regression
- Discriminant analysis
- Logit and probit Models
- Panel models
- Cox proportional hazards model
- Neural networks
- Classification trees

== See also ==
- Jarrow–Turnbull model
- Merton model
- KMV model

== Reading ==
- de Servigny, Arnaud and Olivier Renault (2004). The Standard & Poor's Guide to Measuring and Managing Credit Risk. McGraw-Hill. ISBN 978-0-07-141755-6.
- Duffie, Darrell and Kenneth J. Singleton (2003). Credit Risk: Pricing, Measurement, and Management. Princeton University Press. ISBN 978-0-691-09046-7.
