= 2010 European Union bank stress test =

Banking stress test exercise

A European Union-wide banking stress test exercise has been conducted by the Committee of European Banking Supervisors every year since 2009. The second instance was performed in July 2010. The Council of the European Union (in its economic and financial – ECOFIN – configuration) mandated that Committee so to do, in the aftermath of the 2008 financial crisis.

== Summary of 2010 results by bank ==
The 2010 test was the second of its kind, which assesses the financial strength of European banks under different adverse scenarios. This was done in co-operation with the European Central Bank, the European Commission and the national supervisory authorities of the member states.

The 2010 results were released on 23 July 2010. Of the 90 banks tested, 7 failed the 6% tier 1 capital ratio threshold: five in Spain (Unnim, Diada, Espiga, Banca Cívica, and Cajasur), one in Germany (Hypo Real Estate), and one in Greece (ATEBank).

| Bank | Member state | Tier 1 capital/MEUR | Assets/MEUR | Tier 1 ratio/% | Benchmark/% | Adverse/% | Shock/% | Additional capital needed/MEUR |
|---|---|---|---|---|---|---|---|---|
| Erste Group Bank AG | Austria | 11486 | 125486 | 9.2 | 10.4 | 8.1 | 8.0 | |
| KBC Bank | Belgium | 13440 | 123225 | 10.9 | 12.2 | 9.79 | 9.4 | |
| Dexia | Belgium | 17573 | 143170 | 12.3 | 13.4 | 11.2 | 10.9 | |
| Cyprus Popular Bank Public Co Ltd | Cyprus | 2411 | 25622 | 9.4 | 10.0 | 8.5 | 7.1 | |
| Bank of Cyprus Public Co Ltd | Cyprus | 2533 | 24065 | 10.5 | 10.9 | 9.4 | 8.0 | |
| Danske Bank | Denmark | 15874 | 135510 | 11.7 | 11.7 | 10.8 | 10.0 | |
| Jyske Bank | Denmark | 1817 | 13494 | 13.5 | 14.1 | 12.8 | 12.5 | |
| Sydbank | Denmark | 1374 | 10470 | 13.1 | 14.8 | 13.4 | 13.2 | |
| OP-Pohjola Group | Finland | 5227 | 41480 | 12.6 | 13.4 | 12.5 | 12.3 | |
| BNP Paribas | France | 62910 | 620714 | 10.1 | 13.4 | 12.5 | 12.3 | |
| Crédit Agricole | France | 52405 | 538903 | 9.7 | 10.6 | 9.2 | 9.0 | |
| BPCE | France | 37574 | 411135 | 9.1 | 10.2 | 8.7 | 8.5 | |
| Société Générale | France | 34693 | 324080 | 10.7 | 11.9 | 10.2 | 10.0 | |
| Deutsche Bank AG | Germany | 34406 | 273477 | 12.6 | 13.2 | 10.3 | 9.7 | |
| Commerzbank AG | Germany | 29521 | 280133 | 10.5 | 10.5 | 9.3 | 9.1 | |
| Hypo Real Estate Holdings AG | Germany | 7613 | 80966 | 9.4 | 7.8 | 5.3 | 4.7 | 1245 |
| Landesbank Baden-Württemberg | Germany | 13914 | 142525 | 9.8 | 9.8 | 8.4 | 8.1 | |
| Bayerische Landesbank | Germany | 14788 | 135787 | 10.9 | 11.9 | 9.1 | 8.8 | |
| DZ Bank AG (Deutsche Zentralgenossenschaftbank) | Germany | 9408 | 95024 | 9.9 | 10.4 | 9.2 | 8.7 | |
| Norddeutsche Landesbank GZ | Germany | 6931 | 92576 | 7.5 | 8.0 | 6.4 | 6.2 | |
| Deutsche Postbank AG | Germany | 4906 | 68701 | 7.1 | 7.9 | 6.7 | 6.6 | |
| WestLB AG | Germany | 5148 | 35651 | 14.4 | 12.4 | 8.9 | 7.1 | |
| HSH Nordbank AG | Germany | 7491 | 71391 | 10.5 | 14.9 | 9.9 | 9.7 | |
| Landesbank Hessen-Thüringen GZ | Germany | 5416 | 61272 | 8.8 | 8.9 | 7.9 | 7.3 | |
| Landesbank Berlin AG | Germany | 5642 | 42363 | 13.3 | 12.8 | 11.3 | 11.2 | |
| DekaBank Deutsche Girozentrale | Germany | 2821 | 28815 | 9.8 | 11.1 | 9.5 | 8.4 | |
| WGZ Bank AG Westdeutsche Genossenschafts-Zentralbank | Germany | 1833 | 18981 | 9.7 | 10.8 | 9.5 | 9.1 | |
| National Bank of Greece | Greece | 7590 | 67407 | 11.3 | 11.7 | 9.6 | 7.40 | |
| EFG Eurobank Ergasias, S.A. | Greece | 5349 | 47827 | 11.2 | 11.7 | 10.2 | 8.17 | |
| Alpha Bank | Greece | 5920 | 51084 | 11.6 | 12.3 | 10.9 | 8.22 | |
| Piraeus Bank Group | Greece | 3401 | 37394 | 9.1 | 10.9 | 8.3 | 6.0 | |
| Agricultural Bank of Greece S.A. (ATEbank) | Greece | 1263 | 15100 | 8.4 | 10.7 | 8.9 | 4.36 | 242.6 |
| TT Hellenic Postbank S.A. | Greece | 1286 | 7525 | 17.1 | 17.0 | 15.0 | 10.1 | |
| OTP Bank NYRT. | Hungary | 3521 | 25463 | 13.8 | 18.0 | 16.8 | 16.2 | |
| FHB Jelzálogbank Nyilvánosan Működő RT. | Hungary | 122 | 1428 | 8.6 | 14.1 | 10.8 | 10.6 | |
| Bank of Ireland | Ireland | 9575 | 104639 | 9.2 | 9.0 | 7.6 | 7.1 | |
| Allied Irish Banks | Ireland | 8542 | 121605 | 7.0 | 9.5 | 7.2 | 6.5 | |
| UniCredit | Italy | 39034 | 452388 | 8.6 | 10.0 | 8.1 | 7.8 | |
| Intesa Sanpaolo | Italy | 30205 | 361750 | 8.3 | 9.8 | 8.8 | 8.2 | |
| Banca Monte dei Paschi di Siena | Italy | 9093 | 120899 | 7.5 | 7.6 | 6.8 | 6.2 | |
| Banco Popolare | Italy | 7125 | 92623 | 7.7 | 7.8 | 7.4 | 7.0 | |
| Unione di Banche Italiane SCPA (UBI Banca) | Italy | 6817 | 85677 | 8.0 | 7.6 | 7.1 | 6.8 | |
| Banque et Caisse D’Épargne de l’État | Luxembourg | 1552 | 13569 | 11.4 | 14.2 | 11.5 | 11.3 | |
| Banque Raiffeisen | Luxembourg | 195 | 2286 | 8.5 | 9.8 | 8.4 | 8.2 | |
| Bank of Valletta | Malta | 343 | 3269 | 10.5 | 11.5 | 11.0 | 9.3 | |
| ING Bank | The Netherlands | 34015 | 332375 | 10.2 | 11.2 | 9.1 | 8.8 | |
| Rabobank Group | The Netherlands | 33226 | 236320 | 14.1 | 14.8 | 12.7 | 12.5 | |
| ABN/Fortis Bank Nederland (Holdings) NV | The Netherlands | 15481 | 118703 | 13.0 | 12.0 | 10.3 | 9.9 | |
| SNS Bank | The Netherlands | 2766 | 25885 | 10.7 | 12.0 | 10.8 | 10.5 | |
| PKO Bank Polski | Poland | 3960 | 29691 | 13.3 | 16.5 | 15.7 | 15.4 | |
| Caixa Geral de Depósitos | Portugal | 5983 | 71041 | 8.4 | 9.1 | 8.4 | 8.2 | |
| Banco Comercial Português | Portugal | 6102 | 65623 | 9.3 | 9.4 | 8.4 | 8.4 | |
| Espírito Santo Financial Group S.A. | Portugal | 5199 | 67899 | 7.7 | 9.2 | 7.4 | 6.9 | |
| Banco BPI | Portugal | 2210 | 26060 | 8.5 | 11.6 | 10.3 | 10.2 | |
| Nova ljubljanska banka | Slovenia | 917 | 12163 | 7.5 | 7.0 | 7.4 | 6.3 | |
| Grupo Santander | Spain | 56005 | 562616 | 10.0 | 11.0 | 10.2 | 10.0 | |
| Grupo BBVA | Spain | 27255 | 290062 | 9.4 | 10.6 | 9.6 | 9.3 | |
| "Jupiter": Caja Madrid, Bancaja, etc. | Spain | 19244 | 223066 | 8.6 | 8.8 | 6.8 | 6.3 | |
| La Caixa | Spain | 16800 | 162979 | 10.3 | 10.6 | 8.5 | 7.7 | |
| "Base": Caja de Ahorros Mediterráneo, etc. | Spain | 8087 | 86534 | 9.3 | 10.5 | 8.4 | 7.8 | |
| Banco Popular Español | Spain | 8457 | 92571 | 9.1 | 9.2 | 7.5 | 7.0 | |
| Banco de Sabadell | Spain | 5211 | 57958 | 9.0 | 9.6 | 7.7 | 7.2 | |
| Diada | Spain | 3470 | 52861 | 6.6 | 6.4 | 4.5 | 3.9 | 1032 |
| "Breogan": Caja de Ahorros de Galicia, Caixanova, etc. | Spain | 5035 | 58516 | 8.6 | 10.1 | 7.8 | 7.2 | |
| "Mare Nostrum": Caja de Ahorros de Murcia, SA Nostra, etc. | Spain | 4129 | 45858 | 9.0 | 9.7 | 7.6 | 7.0 | |
| Bankinter, S.A. | Spain | 2291 | 30659 | 7.5 | 8.4 | 7.6 | 6.8 | |
| "Espiga": Caja Duero, Caja España, etc. | Spain | 2475 | 28881 | 8.6 | 8.2 | 6.1 | 5.6 | 127 |
| “Banca Cívica”: Caja Navarra, etc. | Spain | 2900 | 30055 | 9.6 | 7.6 | 5.2 | 4.7 | 406 |
| Ibercaja | Spain | 2369 | 25291 | 9.4 | 9.1 | 7.3 | 6.7 | |
| Unicaja | Spain | 2584 | 21909 | 11.8 | 11.8 | 9.6 | 9.0 | |
| Banco Pastor | Spain | 1974 | 18713 | 10.5 | 8.7 | 6.8 | 6.0 | |
| Caja Sol | Spain | 2197 | 21237 | 10.3 | 8.7 | 6.6 | 6.0 | |
| Bilbao Bizkaia Kutxa | Spain | 2812 | 19202 | 14.6 | 17.4 | 14.7 | 14.1 | |
| “Unnim”: Caixa Sabadell, etc. | Spain | 1426 | 19703 | 7.2 | 6.6 | 5.1 | 4.5 | 270 |
| Kutxa | Spain | 2099 | 16100 | 13.0 | 12.6 | 11.1 | 10.6 | |
| “Caja3”: Caja Círculo, etc. | Spain | 1414 | 14994 | 9.4 | 8.8 | 6.6 | 6.1 | |
| Cajasur | Spain | 222 | 12094 | 1.8 | 6.6 | 4.9 | 4.3 | 208 |
| Banca March | Spain | 1866 | 9488 | 19.7 | 20.8 | 19.5 | 19.0 | |
| Banco Guipuzcoano | Spain | 709 | 7813 | 9.1 | 8.1 | 6.6 | 6.1 | |
| Caja Vital Kutxa | Spain | 755 | 6652 | 11.3 | 9.5 | 7.5 | 7.0 | |
| Caja de Ahorros y Monte de Piedad de Ontinyent | Spain | 61 | 688 | 8.9 | 8.4 | 6.6 | 6.6 | |
| Colonya, Caixa de Pollença | Spain | 18 | 183 | 9.9 | 9.1 | 6.6 | 6.2 | |
| Nordea | Sweden | 19577 | 191858 | 10.2 | 11.3 | 10.2 | 10.1 | |
| SEB | Sweden | 10025 | 80585 | 12.4 | 11.8 | 10.7 | 10.3 | |
| Svenska Handelsbanken | Sweden | 8604 | 94617 | 9.1 | 10.2 | 9.1 | 8.9 | |
| Swedbank | Sweden | 7968 | 76518 | 10.4 | 10.7 | 10.5 | 9.9 | |
| Royal Bank of Scotland | United Kingdom | 62898 | 438200 | 14.4 | 14.1 | 11.7 | 11.2 | |
| HSBC Holdings Plc | United Kingdom | 122157 | 1133200 | 10.8 | 11.7 | 10.4 | 10.2 | |
| Barclays | United Kingdom | 49637 | 382649 | 13.0 | 15.8 | 13.9 | 13.7 | |
| Lloyds Banking Group | United Kingdom | 47530 | 493307 | 9.6 | 10.8 | 9.4 | 9.2 | |

- MEUR = million euros
- Assets = total risk-weighted assets
- Benchmark = tier 1 ratio with benchmark scenario at 31 December 2011
- Adverse = tier 1 ratio with adverse scenario at 31 December 2011
- Shock = tier 1 ratio with additional sovereign shock on the adverse scenario at 31 December 2011
- Additional capital needed = additional capital needed to reach 6% tier 1 ratio under adverse scenario at 31 December 2011

== See also ==
- List of bank stress tests
- European System of Financial Supervisors
- Supervisory Capital Assessment Program, a similar exercise in the United States of America
