= Word of the year (Germany) =

Most important word of the year chosen in Germany

The word of the year (German: Wort des Jahres, pronounced [ˌvɔʁt dɛs ˈjaːʁəs]) is an annual publication by the Gesellschaft für deutsche Sprache, established in 1971 (on a regular basis since 1977). Each December, a German word or word group is named in a linguistic review of the year.

Year	Word of the year (German)	Etymology English translation	Explanation
1971	aufmüpfig	Rebellious, insubordinate	Characterization of the 1960s counterculture, especially the German student movement
1977	Szene	Scene, community	Reference to a number of news-making communities, e.g. drug scene, gay scene, disco scene
1978	konspirative Wohnung	Conspirative apartment	Reference to the hideout of the kidnappers of Hanns Martin Schleyer, which the police failed to locate
1979	Holocaust	Holocaust	The original broadcast of the American TV miniseries Holocaust, which led to an increased public interest in Nazi crimes.
1980	Rasterfahndung	Dragnet investigation	Proposed measures for computer-aided searches for wanted criminals that led to a heated political and public debate about information privacy.
1981	Nulllösung	Zero Option	Reference to a proposal by then-President of the United States Ronald Reagan for the withdrawal of all Soviet and US intermediate-range nuclear missiles from Europe
1982	Ellenbogengesellschaft	Literally "elbow society", dog eat dog competition	Term used by critics who feared a culture lacking social skills was growing, which emphasized egoism, ruthlessness, and competitiveness
1983	Heißer Herbst	Hot/heated autumn	Reference to a series of large-scale protests against the NATO Double-Track Decision and the strengthening peace movement
1984	Umweltauto	Environment-friendly car, low-energy vehicle	Reference to one of the topics of the environmental movement
1985	Glykol	Diethylene glycol	The toxic additive uncovered in a widespread wine adulteration scandal.
1986	Tschernobyl	Chernobyl	Reference to the Chernobyl disaster
1987	AIDS, Kondom	AIDS and condom	The growing media attention paid to the spreading HIV/AIDS disease and subsequent campaign for safe sex
1988	Gesundheitsreform	Healthcare reform	Reference to the dominant political discussion of that year
1989	Reisefreiheit	Freedom of travel	The most prominent demand during the Peaceful Revolution, which was achieved with the fall of the Berlin Wall
1990	Die neuen Bundesländer	The new German states	The states of Brandenburg, Saxony, Saxony-Anhalt, Thuringia and Mecklenburg-Vorpommern, which became part of the Federal Republic of Germany in the German reunification
1991	Besserwessi	Compound of besser ("better") and Wessi (informal term for a citizen of West Germany), thus resembling the German word Besserwisser ("know-it-all", "smart arse")	A perception by former citizens of East Germany in the post-reunification period that their lifetime achievements under Communist rule were regarded as inferior and valueless by West Germans
1992	Politikverdrossenheit	Indifference to politics	Perceived political indifference from decreasing voter turnouts and party membership numbers
1993	Sozialabbau	Reduction of social benefits	Reference to austerity measures taken by the conservative government of Helmut Kohl
1994	Superwahljahr	super election year	The environment of perpetual election campaign for politicians, due to a federal election, European parliament election, and eight state elections converging in 1994
1995	Multimedia	Multimedia	Buzzword used for state-of-the-art developments in computer and digital technology
1996	Sparpaket	Austerity package	The dominance in political discussions of the time about how to shoulder the immense follow-up costs of the German reunification
1997	Reformstau	Literally "reform jam"	The perceived political standstill during the later years of the Kohl government
1998	Rot-Grün	Red-green	Reference to the coalition government of Social Democrats and Greens, led by newly elected chancellor Gerhard Schröder
1999	Millennium	Millennium	The term was used as an ubiquitous buzzword in public anticipation of the year 2000
2000	Schwarzgeldaffäre	Literally "black money affair"	Reference to the donations scandal of the Christian Democratic Party, with Helmut Kohl as its key figure
2001	Der elfte September	11 September	Reference to the September 11 attacks
2002	Teuro	Portmanteau of teuer ("expensive", "pricey") and Euro	The widespread public perception that the currency changeover from the Deutsche Mark to the Euro had led to a hidden price increase
2003	Das alte Europa	The old Europe	A term coined by then U.S. Secretary of Defense Donald Rumsfeld, referring to European countries that did not support the 2003 invasion of Iraq
2004	Hartz IV		Name of a highly controversial set of reforms of the German labor market
2005	Bundeskanzlerin	Female form of "Federal Chancellor"	Angela Merkel became the first woman to hold the post of German chancellor
2006	Fanmeile	Literally "fan mile"	Reference to public screenings of the matches of the 2006 FIFA World Cup, which attracted hundreds of thousands of spectators
2007	Klimakatastrophe	Climate catastrophe	Reference to the worst possible outcome of the global warming, which came to widespread public attention, mainly due to the IPCC Fourth Assessment Report and the documentary film An Inconvenient Truth
2008	Finanzkrise	Financial crisis	The dominance of the 2008 financial crisis in political discussions that year
2009	Abwrackprämie	Scrapping bonus	Reference to a political measure to help the automobile industry through the Great Recession, which saw a bonus of €2,500 for those buying a brand new car and scrapping the old one instead of reselling it
2010	Wutbürger	Compound of Wut ("anger", "rage") and Bürger ("citizen") – literally "enraged citizen"	Stereotype of middle-aged, socially and financially secure people without any previous experience in attending demonstrations, who protest in the streets in an emotional, heated manner (especially characterizing the opponents of the Stuttgart 21 project)
2011	Stresstest	Stress test	A reference to a series of unrelated stability simulations: the 2011 European Union bank stress test, a reassessment of nuclear power stations following the Fukushima Daiichi nuclear disaster, and the arbitration process concerning Stuttgart 21.
2012	Rettungsroutine	Literally "rescue routine"	A rarely used term coined by German politician Wolfgang Bosbach, criticizing the series of measures addressing the European debt crisis that passed the Bundestag in a rushed manner, possibly without sufficient debate and consideration of alternatives
2013	GroKo	Acronym for Große Koalition ("grand coalition")	A reference to the upcoming governmental coalition in the Bundestag, formed by CDU/CSU and SPD
2014	Lichtgrenze	Literally light border	The name of an art installation by Christopher Bauder, tracing the path of the Berlin Wall as part of the celebrations of the 25th anniversary of its Fall.
2015	Flüchtlinge	Refugees	A reference to the European migrant crisis, with refugees of the Syrian Civil War and other refugees, asylum seekers and forcibly displaced people arriving in European Union countries, to varying degrees of welcome. In 2015, some 40% of these arrivals applied for asylum in Germany.
2016	postfaktisch	post truth	A reference to the increasing tendency to form opinions based on emotions rather than facts in political and public discourse. More and more people are turning so reluctant towards "those on top" that they become willing to ignore facts and accept even open lies eagerly. Not claims to the truth, but openly daring to speak the "felt truth" leads to success in a post-truth age. The Brexit campaign's thriving partially on deliberate misinformation, as well as discriminatory remarks and untrue claims (such as President Barack Obama supposedly having founded ISIS) leading to the victory of Donald Trump in the 2016 United States presidential election, are cited as recent examples of this phenomenon.
2017	Jamaika-Aus	end of the Jamaica coalition	A reference to the failure of preliminary talks for negotiations a coalition government between the Christian Democratic Union/Christian Social Union (CDU/CSU), Free Democratic Party (FDP), and the Green Party factions, represented by the colors black, yellow, and green, respectively, as found in the Flag of Jamaica, and the public announcement thereof.
2018	Heißzeit	"hot time / heat age", i.e. hothouse earth	A reference to the 2018 European heat wave, which was considered by many Germans to last from April to November. It is also supposed to hint at one of the gravest global phenomena of the early 21st century: climate change. Last but not least, "Heißzeit" is an interesting word creation – phonologically analogous to "Eiszeit" ("ice age"), the expression acquires an epochal dimension transcending the literal meaning of "time interval during which it is hot" and potentially points to a changing climatic period.
2019	Respektrente	"respect pension"	"It refers to pensioners being able to enjoy their retirement with dignity after many years of hard work.""
2020	Corona-Pandemie	"corona[virus] pandemic"	A reference to the COVID-19 pandemic that affected most of the world and weakened most countries' economies.
2021	Wellenbrecher	"wave-breaker"	A word describing measures which "stop new waves of COVID-19 infections".
2022	Zeitenwende	"historic turning point"	Coined by chancellor Olaf Scholz in his Zeitenwende speech, refers to the Russian war against Ukraine.
2023	Krisenmodus	"crisis mode"	GfdS managing director Andrea Ewels said that society has been in "crisis mode" since 2020, she said, referring to the Coronavirus pandemic, Russia's attack on Ukraine, the energy crisis, the educational crisis and the attack by the terrorist militia Hamas on Israel.
2024	Ampel-Aus	end of the "traffic light" coalition	Parallel to the 2017 Word of the Year, referring to the end of the coalition government between Social Democratic Party (SPD), Free Democratic Party (FDP), and the Green Party (represented by the red, yellow, and green colors in a traffic light) in December 2024.
2025	KI-Ära	"AI era"	Reference to the AI boom of the 2020s.

== See also ==
- Word of the year
- Un-word of the year
- Youth word of the year (Germany)
