= 2016 European Union bank stress test =

The European Union-wide banking stress test 2016 was conducted by the European Banking Authority (EBA) in order to assess the resilience of financial institutions in the European Union to a hypothetical adverse market scenario. The stress test was formally launched on 24 February 2016 with a publication of the final methodology and templates as well as the scenarios. It covered over 70% of the national banking-industry assets in the euro area, each EU member state and Norway. 53 EU banks participated in the exercise, 39 of which are directly supervised by the ECB under European Banking Supervision. The outcomes of the exercise, including banks' individual results, were published on 29 July 2016, at 22:00 CET.

== Background ==
The European Banking Authority (EBA) aims to ensure the proper functioning of financial markets and the stability of the financial system in the EU. To this end, the EBA has the right to conduct the EU-wide stress tests, in cooperation with the European Systemic Risk Board (ESRB). Such exercises are designed to test the resilience of financial institutions to adverse market developments.

The stress tests are performed in cooperation with the ESRB, the European Central Bank (ECB), national competent authorities and the European Commission. In particular, the EBA was responsible for the common methodology and disclosure of the results. The ESRB and the European Commission designed the underlying macroeconomic scenarios. The quality assurance process of banks' results was led by the ECB and national competent authorities. Moreover, the ECB conducted the Asset Quality Review that served as a starting point of the stress test.

== Features of the stress test ==
Banks needed to assess the impact of a macroeconomic baseline and adverse scenario. The scenarios each covered a period of three years (2015–2018). The macroeconomic adverse scenario and any risk type specific shocks linked to the scenario are developed by the ESRB and the ECB in close cooperation with competent authorities, the EBA and the European Commission. The latter will also provide the macroeconomic baseline scenario.

Risk types considered in the stress test included credit risk including securitisations, market risk and counterparty credit risk, operational risk including conduct risk. In addition, banks are requested to project the effect of the scenarios on net interest income and to stress P&L and capital items not covered by other risk types. The 2016 exercise adds an explicit treatment of conduct risk and FX lending to its scope.

The stress test relied on a static balance sheet assumption as of 31 December 2015, implying no new growth and a constant business mix and model over the whole time horizon.methodology

The exercise is run at the highest level of consolidation. The scope of consolidation is the perimeter of the banking group as defined by the CRR/CRD IV (i.e. the implementation of Basel III in the EU). Insurance activities are therefore excluded both from the balance sheet and the revenues and costs side of the P&L.

As opposed to the 2014 stress test, no single capital threshold is defined for this exercise as banks will be assessed against relevant supervisory capital ratios under a static balance sheet and the results will inform the 2016 round of Supervisory Review and Evaluation Processes (SREP) under which decisions are made on appropriate capital resources and forward looking capital plans are challenged. No hurdle rates or capital thresholds are defined for the purpose of the exercise. However, competent authorities will apply stress test results as an input to the supervisory review and evaluation process.

== Results ==
No bank will be said to have failed because the test won't judge banks against a single capital threshold as in previous exercises.

The outcomes of the exercise, including banks' individual results, was published on 29 July 2016. An expedited publication is designed to align the finalisation of the exercise with the cycle of the annual supervisory review and evaluation process (SREP), as this will ensure the results of the stress test are incorporated as an input to that process. DZ Bank was excluded from the test due to the ongoing merger with WGZ Bank, as well as National Bank of Greece was already covered in 2015 Comprehensive Assessment of European Central Bank.

The following table lists the 52 banks that undergone the stress test:

Fully loaded CET1 capital ratio
Bank	Country	Starting 2015	Baseline 2018	Adverse 2018	Delta Adverse 2018
Erste Group Bank AG	Austria	12.25%	13.55%	8.02%	-423
Raiffeisen-Landesbanken-Holding GmbH	Austria	10.20%	12.33%	6.12%	-408
KBC Group NV	Belgium	14.65%	17.60%	11.41%	-323
Belfius Banque SA	Belgium	14.88%	16.18%	11.27%	-361
Deutsche Bank AG	Germany	11.99%	12.41%	8.34%	-365
Commerzbank AG	Germany	12.13%	13.13%	7.42%	-471
Landesbank Baden-Württemberg	Germany	13.50%	14.17%	9.53%	-397
Bayerische Landesbank	Germany	11.11%	12.08%	7.80%	-332
Norddeutsche Landesbank Girozentrale	Germany	15.98%	15.58%	9.40%	-658
Landesbank Hessen-Thüringen Girozentrale	Germany	13.11%	14.42%	10.10%	-301
NRW.BANK	Germany	12.09%	13.16%	8.62%	-347
Volkswagen Financial Services AG	Germany	42.54%	39.44%	35.40%	-714
DekaBank Deutsche Girozentrale	Germany	11.67%	12.90%	9.55%	-211
Danske Bank	Denmark	15.48%	17.66%	14.02%	-147
Nykredit Realkredit	Denmark	16.00%	19.84%	13.99%	-201
Jyske Bank	Denmark	19.19%	22.03%	13.86%	-533
Banco Santander S.A.	Spain	10.27%	12.03%	8.19%	-208
Banco Bilbao Vizcaya Argentaria S.A.	Spain	11.72%	12.81%	8.04%	-369
Criteria Caixa Holding	Spain	10.20%	13.45%	6.62%	-358
BFA Tenedora de Acciones S.A	Spain	10.19%	13.17%	8.20%	-199
Banco Popular Español S.A.	Spain	13.74%	14.42%	9.58%	-417
Banco de Sabadell S.A.	Spain	9.65%	10.97%	7.81%	-184
OP-Pohjola osk	Finland	19.16%	20.92%	14.61%	-455
BNP Paribas	France	10.87%	12.09%	8.51%	-236
Crédit Agricole Group	France	12.78%	14.36%	9.47%	-331
Société Générale	France	15.55%	16.62%	13.38%	-216
BPCE	France	13.68%	14.81%	10.49%	-319
Confédération Nationale du Crédit Mutuel	France	14.51%	14.95%	9.82%	-470
La Banque Postale	France	10.91%	11.61%	7.50%	-341
OTP Bank Nyrt.	Hungary	12.94%	14.56%	9.22%	-372
The Governor and Company of the Bank of Ireland	Ireland	13.11%	13.90%	4.31%	-880
Allied Irish Banks plc	Ireland	11.28%	15.03%	6.15%	-513
UniCredit S.p.A.	Italy				
Intesa Sanpaolo S.p.A.	Italy	12.39%	14.61%	9.00%	-339
Banca Monte dei Paschi di Siena S.p.A.	Italy				
Banco Popolare S.C.	Italy	10.38%	11.47%	7.10%	-329
Unione di Banche Italiane S.p.A.	Italy	11.62%	13.01%	8.85%	-277
ING Groep N.V.	The Netherlands	15.44%	16.20%	9.53%	-591
Coöperatieve Centrale Raiffeisen-Boerenleenbank B.A. (RABO)	The Netherlands	11.97%	13.33%	8.10%	-387
ABN AMRO Group N.V.	The Netherlands	12.70%	12.50%	8.98%	-371
N.V. Bank Nederlandse Gemeenten	The Netherlands	26.17%	28.05%	17.62%	-855
DNB Bank Group	Norway	14.31%	16.56%	14.30%	-1
Powszechna Kasa Oszczednosci Bank Polski SA	Poland	13.42%	14.73%	11.44%	-198
Nordea Bank (group)	Sweden	16.45%	18.60%	14.09%	-236
Svenska Handelsbanken (group)	Sweden	18.85%	21.55%	16.60%	-225
Skandinaviska Enskilda Banken (group)	Sweden	21.25%	23.09%	18.55%	-270
Swedbank (group)	Sweden	25.08%	27.47%	23.05%	-203
HSBC Holdings plc	United Kingdom	11.35%	12.48%	7.30%	-405
Barclays Plc	United Kingdom	11.87%	12.41%	8.76%	-312
The Royal Bank of Scotland Group plc	United Kingdom	13.05%	16.44%	10.14%	-291
Lloyds Banking Group Plc	United Kingdom	15.53%	15.89%	8.08%	-745
