= List of bank stress tests =

Analysis of a bank's ability to endure an adverse scenario

This list covers formal bank stress testing programs, as implemented by major regulators worldwide. It does not cover bank proprietary, internal testing programs.

A bank stress test is an analysis of a bank's ability to endure a hypothetical adverse economic scenario. Stress tests became widely used after the 2008 financial crisis.

== Example ==
For example, in the U.S. in 2012, an adverse scenario used in stress testing was all of the following:

- Unemployment at 13 percent
- 50 percent drop in equity prices
- 21 percent decline in housing prices.

== Asia ==
- Monetary Authority of Singapore
  - Annual Industry-Wide Stress Testing exercise (usually around Q1)
- International Monetary Fund
  - 2011 and 2012 stress testing of Japan banks, Financial System Stability Assessment Update (FSAP)
- China Banking Regulatory Commission
  - 2011 CARPLES risk indicators framework
- Australian Prudential Regulation Authority
  - 2014 industry stress test
- Reserve Bank of New Zealand
  - 2014 major bank stress test

== Europe ==
- Financial Services Authority (UK)
  - 2008 Stress and scenario testing CP08/24
  - 2009 Stress and Scenario Testing Feedback on CP08/24
- Bank of England
  - Annual industry stress test
- European Banking Authority (euro area)
  - 2009 European Union bank stress test
  - 2010 European Union bank stress test
  - 2011 European Union bank stress test
  - 2014 European Union bank stress test
    - The stress test was part of the Comprehensive Assessment by the European Central Bank.
  - 2016 European Union bank stress test (scenario release: Wednesday 24 February 2016)
  - 2018 European Union bank stress test (scenario release: Likely end February 2018 " final methodology will be published as the exercise is launched, at the beginning of 2018,")

== Americas ==
- Federal Reserve System
  - 2009 Supervisory Capital Assessment Program (SCAP)
  - Note: there was no 2010 stress test in the USA
  - Comprehensive Capital Analysis and Review (CCAR)
    - 2011
    - 2012
    - 2013
      - A private conference call was held with banks to notify them of a new, two part information release by the Fed
        - March 7, 2013 – Banks will be privately notified of the Fed's tentative decision on capital distribution plans.
        - Banks receiving a "no" will then have a 48 hours to privately resubmit to the Fed a reduced a distribution plan.
        - March 14, 2013 – the Fed will publicly disclose final decisions on requests for capital distributions
        - The week of private negotiations between the bank and the Fed will allow banks to adjust their request downward to what the Fed will allow. This was specifically designed to allow banks to avoid "embarrassing capital-plan rejections"
        - Shareholder lawsuits are expected if banks fail to disclose capital distribution plans and Fed rejections (even if labeled "informal") as the majority of shareholders and prospective shareholders regard bank dividend and share buyback plans, and limits, to be extremely material information.
        - Banks may not follow Fed advice and release capital distribution plans in advance of March 14.
    - 2014
    - 2015
    - 2016
    - 2017
    - 2018
  - Dodd-Frank Act Stress Tests
    - 2013-2018
- Central Bank of Brazil (Portuguese: Banco Central do Brasil)

== See also ==
- Bank regulation
- Basel III
- Stress test (financial)
- Systemically important financial institution
- List of systemically important banks
