= 2011 European Union bank stress test =

A European Union-wide banking stress test has been conducted by the Committee of European Banking Supervisors every year since 2009. The second instance (2010 European Union banking stress test exercise) was performed in July 2010. This third round was carried out with results published in July 2011. The Council of the European Union (in its economic and financial – ECOFIN – configuration) mandated that Committee so to do, in the aftermath of the 2008 financial crisis.

== 2011 stress test results ==
The results for the 2011 exercises were published on 15 July. Eight out of 90 banks failed the test—five in Spain, two in Greece and one in Austria. Spain also is one of the leading countries in the list of approved banks (20), because it put up almost all of its financial sector (95 per cent, against an average of about 60 per cent).

The test is controversial, because Spain and Germany have complained the stress tests excluded dynamic provisions recognised by local regulators. In fact, a German bank didn't pass the test but they refused to publish its data and therefore it is not included in the official list

== See also ==
- List of bank stress tests
- European System of Financial Supervisors
- Supervisory Capital Assessment Program, a similar exercise in the United States of America
