= Un-word of the year =

German ironic award

Un-word of the year (German: Unwort des Jahres, pronounced [ˈʊnˌvɔʁt dɛs ˈjaːʁəs]) is an annual selection of one new or recently popularized term that allegedly violates human rights or infringes upon democratic principles, made by a panel of German linguists. The term may be one that discriminates against societal groups or may be euphemistic, disguising or misleading. The term is chosen from suggestions sent in by the public. The choice of the word does not depend on how many times it was suggested, but reflects the judgement of the panel. The core of the panel consists of four linguists and one journalist. The un-word of the previous year is announced every January.

The linguistic action was started in 1994 by the linguist Horst Dieter Schlosser. The yearly publication of the "un-words of the year" is today widely reported in German media and very popular among Germans. In 2007, the president of the German PEN association, Johano Strasser, criticized the selections as being "themselves a symptom of the language neglect that it pretends to be able to heal" and having the quality of Deutschland sucht den Superstar (a popular German talent show).

== History ==
Between 1991 and 1993, the un-word was announced by the Gesellschaft für deutsche Sprache, alongside the Word of the Year. In 1994, following a row with the then German government led by Helmut Kohl, the jury led by linguist Horst Dieter Schlosser decided to become independent of any state-funded institution.

== List of un-words of the year since 1991 ==
=== 1990s ===
In 1999, the jury chose Menschenmaterial as un-word of the 20th century.

Century	Un-word of the century (German)	English translation	Explanation
20th	Menschenmaterial	human material	With this word, a human is considered a mere object. This became particularly apparent in the First and Second World War as many people were used and expended for waging war.

Year	Un-word of the year (German)	English translation	Explanation
1991	ausländerfrei	free of foreigners	Xenophobic, far-right slogan referring to an (ideal) community without any non-German inhabitants, which came to broad public attention during the Hoyerswerda riots.
1992	ethnische Säuberung	ethnic cleansing	Euphemism popularized during the Yugoslav Wars, referring to the elimination of unwanted ethnic or religious groups by deportation, forcible displacement, and mass murder.
1993	Überfremdung	lit. 'over-foreignization'	Xenophobic slogan referring to the fear of the negative impact of immigrants on German culture. Considered to make "undifferentiated xenophobia" sound more argumentative and clinical.
1994	Peanuts	From the English word peanuts	Chosen to criticize the different definitions of an insignificant amount of money by bankers and average people. Hilmar Kopper, then Chairman of the Board of Deutsche Bank, had used the term to refer to a sum of DM 50 million (roughly US$17 million).
1995	Diätenanpassung	adjustment of the remuneration	Euphemism used by members of the Bundestag to refer to the raising of their monetary rewards. The choice of this un-word criticizes the fact that wages for German MPs are set by the MPs themselves, rather than by an independent body.
1996	Rentnerschwemme	lit. 'flood of pensioners/retired persons'	Term used in the political discussion about the social difficulties arising from population ageing. The choice criticizes the "wrong and inhumane impression"; the rising number of people in need of a reasonable old-age provision would be "similar to a natural disaster".
1997	Wohlstandsmüll	lit. 'prosperity waste'	Deprecatory term coined by Helmut Maucher (then CEO of Nestlé) during an interview, referring to people who are either presumed unable or reluctant to find employment, who in his opinion exist because of the highly developed welfare and social support systems in Germany.
1998	sozialverträgliches Frühableben	lit. 'socially acceptable early passing'	Coined by Karsten Vilmar, then head of the German Medical Association, implying that people who die early into their retirement were considered advantageous for the welfare system.
1999	Kollateralschaden	collateral damage	Military term referring to the incidental destruction of civilian property and non-combatant casualties, which came to broad attention during the Kosovo War.

=== 2000s ===
Year	Un-word of the year (German)	English translation	Explanation
2000	national befreite Zone	lit. 'nationally liberated zone'	Euphemism used by Neo-Nazi groups to refer to a region (ranging from a neighborhood to a whole county) defined by a high rate of far-right and xenophobic crimes, which are considered no-go areas by foreigners and leftists.
2001	Gotteskrieger	lit. 'God's warriors'	The glorifying synonym for Mujahideen was chosen as a reference to the Islamist terrorists responsible for the September 11 attacks who claimed to act on behalf of a higher power.
2002	Ich-AG	lit. 'Me, Inc.'	One of the measures of the controversial Hartz concept (a reform of the German labor market), which allows for unemployed people to be registered as self-employed and thus eligible for public support for a start-up business. The choice of this un-word criticizes the Ich-AG as a means of artificially lowering the unemployment rate.
2003	Tätervolk	lit. 'nation of perpetrators'	The term is used by scholars to refer to a possible German collective guilt in relation to the initiation of World War II and the Holocaust. In 2003, Bundestag member Martin Hohmann gave a highly controversial speech in which he described an alleged Jewish involvement in the Russian Revolution, using the Tätervolk term in that context, implying that the term is no more applicable to the Germans than to the Jews.
2004	Humankapital	human capital	The choice criticizes that by using this term, individuals were degraded and classified according to economically relevant quantities.
2005	Entlassungsproduktivität	lit. 'layoff productivity'	Already criticized for being inhumane by then chancellor Gerhard Schröder in 1998, the usage of this term for a surge of productivity a company may encounter after dismissing employees deemed unnecessary had even found entry into textbooks on economics.
2006	freiwillige Ausreise	lit. 'voluntary emigration'	A term used in the context of rejected asylum seekers who opt for leaving Germany on their own terms rather than being formally deported. The choice of the un-word criticizes the euphemistic nature of that wording, as the emigration would not be "voluntary" after all. See also: self-deportation.
2007	Herdprämie	lit. 'stove bonus'	Its origin being unknown, the term was ironically used by opponents of a proposal of German chancellor Angela Merkel's government for the introduction of a special allowance for families in which the small children are educated at home instead of sending them to a kindergarten or similar pre-school institution, alluding to the presumed old-fashioned gender role of a mother fully dedicated to the raising of her children. Critics argued it defames any parents who keep their children at home, irrespective of their actual motives.
2008	notleidende Banken	lit. 'suffering/needy banks'	A wording used during the 2008 financial crisis, by which banks are characterized as victims, rather than catalysts of the meltdown.
2009	betriebsratsverseucht	lit. 'contaminated by works councils'	This offensive neologism (reportedly used internally by the Bauhaus management) describes a business with a strong works council, which takes care of the interests of the employees and thus presses for concessions on the employer's side.

=== 2010s ===
Year	Un-word of the year (German)	English translation	Explanation
2010	alternativlos	without an alternative	This term was frequently used by German chancellor Angela Merkel to describe her measures addressing the European sovereign-debt crisis as the only possible ones. The choice of the un-word criticizes that the term would be undemocratic, as any discussion on the subject would be deemed unnecessary or undesirable. See also: There is no alternative.
2011	Döner-Morde	Döner murders	A term used by police investigators to describe a series of murders of mostly Turkish shop and restaurant owners between 2000 and 2006, originally attributed to presumed links of the victims to organized crime groups. In 2011, it was revealed that, in fact, all of these murders were racial hate crimes committed by members of a previously unknown terrorist group called National Socialist Underground, which resulted in widespread criticism of the police for their initial determination.
2012	Opfer-Abo	lit. 'victim(ization) subscription'	The term was coined by Jörg Kachelmann in the wake of a trial against him on sexual assault charges, in order to promote his perception that women had the tendency to repeatedly make false claims of crimes such as rape, to further their interests. The choice of the un-word criticizes that this term "unacceptably puts women under general suspicion of inventing sexual violence and of thus being perpetrators themselves."
2013	Sozialtourismus	benefit tourism, welfare tourism, lit. 'social tourism'	Referring to foreigners in Germany allegedly leeching on the welfare system.
2014	Lügenpresse	lit. 'liar press', lying press	A term that was initially used in the First World War before being revived by the Nazis in the lead-up to the Second World War, and which has since been revived by the Pegida movement to describe media outlets that they believe to have been infiltrated by left-wing influences and therefore to be spreading lies about the political establishment, immigration, asylum and the Pegida movement itself.
2015	Gutmensch	'do-gooder'/'upstanding citizen'	Used pejoratively, predominantly by followers of movements like Pegida, to mock those who "do good" by supporting diversity, multiculturalism and refugees in Germany; used to criticize what they believe to be liberals' blindness to the threats posed by foreigners in Germany.
2016	Volksverräter	'traitor of the people'	A term also used by anti-immigration right-wing groups including AfD and Pegida.
2017	alternative Fakten	'alternative facts'	Obscuring and misleading expression for the attempt to establish false claims as legitimate means of public discourse.
2018	Anti-Abschiebe-Industrie	'anti-deportation industry'	A term coined by Alexander Dobrindt in May 2018. According to the jury, this term insinuates that people who provide legal assistance to rejected asylum seekers want to make money on a large scale from defending even criminal applicants for asylum. Moreover, this expression suggests that this kind of help "produces" new asylum seekers.
2019	Klimahysterie	'climate (change) hysteria'	The word "climate (change) hysteria" defames climate protection efforts and the climate protection movement, and discredits important discussions about climate protection. The expression was used by many in politics, economics, and the media in 2019 – by the Frankfurter Allgemeine Zeitung as well as by entrepreneurs and especially by politicians of the Alternative for Germany party. It dismisses the increased commitment to climate protection as some kind of collective psychosis. Moreover, in light of scientific findings regarding climate change, this word is misleading and irresponsibly supports anti-scientific tendencies. The term was submitted to the jury nine times.

=== 2020s ===
Year	Un-word of the year (German)	English translation	Explanation
2020	Rückführungspatenschaften	repatriation sponsorships	The term repatriation sponsorships was coined by the European Commission to describe its policy of encouraging member states who refuse to take refugees to instead take responsibility for deporting those whose applications have been rejected. The panel criticised the euphemistic use of the word repatriation to refer to deportation, and the use of the positive term sponsorship in the context of encouraging anti-humanitarian actions. The term was suggested 41 times.
2020	Corona-Diktatur	corona(virus) dictatorship	The term corona dictatorship has been used pejoratively to discredit government responses to the COVID-19 pandemic. The panel described it as downplaying the oppression of actual authoritarian regimes and belittling victims of dictatorship. They noted that it was employed most frequently by far-right extremists, who "themselves seek, in part quite openly, the abolition of civil liberties and the constitution that represents them". The panel also criticised usage of the term as restricting public discourse and making constructive discussion of health measures more difficult. The term was suggested 21 times.
2021	Pushback	pushback	The "pushing-back" of refugees at borders. The panel found the term inappropriately applied by the media.
2022	Klimaterroristen	climate terrorists	Non-violent protest forms of civil disobedience are conflated with actual eco-terrorists, and placed in the context of violence and hostility to the state. Activists are thus "criminalized and defamed".
2023	Remigration	remigration	This word is used as a "right-wing polemic buzzword" and a "euphemistically concealing expression" for forced deportations. It came to public attention when, just a week before the unword announcement, a far-right meeting in Potsdam of AfD party members and right-wing extremists was uncovered.
2024	biodeutsch	biological German	Ethnic or biological German. According to the jury, the term "bio-German" was increasingly used in public and social discourse in 2024, especially in social media, to categorize, evaluate, and discriminate against people based on supposed biological criteria. It was originally used as a satirical expression that played with the label "bio" of a quality seal for organic produce, but has over recent years acquired a non-satirical, literal, use where 'Germanness' is defined biologically to differentiate and devalue Germans with a migration biography. This division into supposedly 'real' Germans and second-class Germans is criticized as a form of everyday racism.
2025	Sondervermögen	special assets	"The term [...] has very clearly shaped political debates about national debt and investment programs." Many citizens are not familiar with its administrative meaning. Its everyday meaning euphemistically masks the fact that it refers to taking on debt.

== See also ==
- Word of the year
- Word of the year (Germany)
- Youth word of the year (Germany)
