= Evil Empire speech =

1983 anti-Soviet speech by Ronald Reagan

- Part of the Cold War
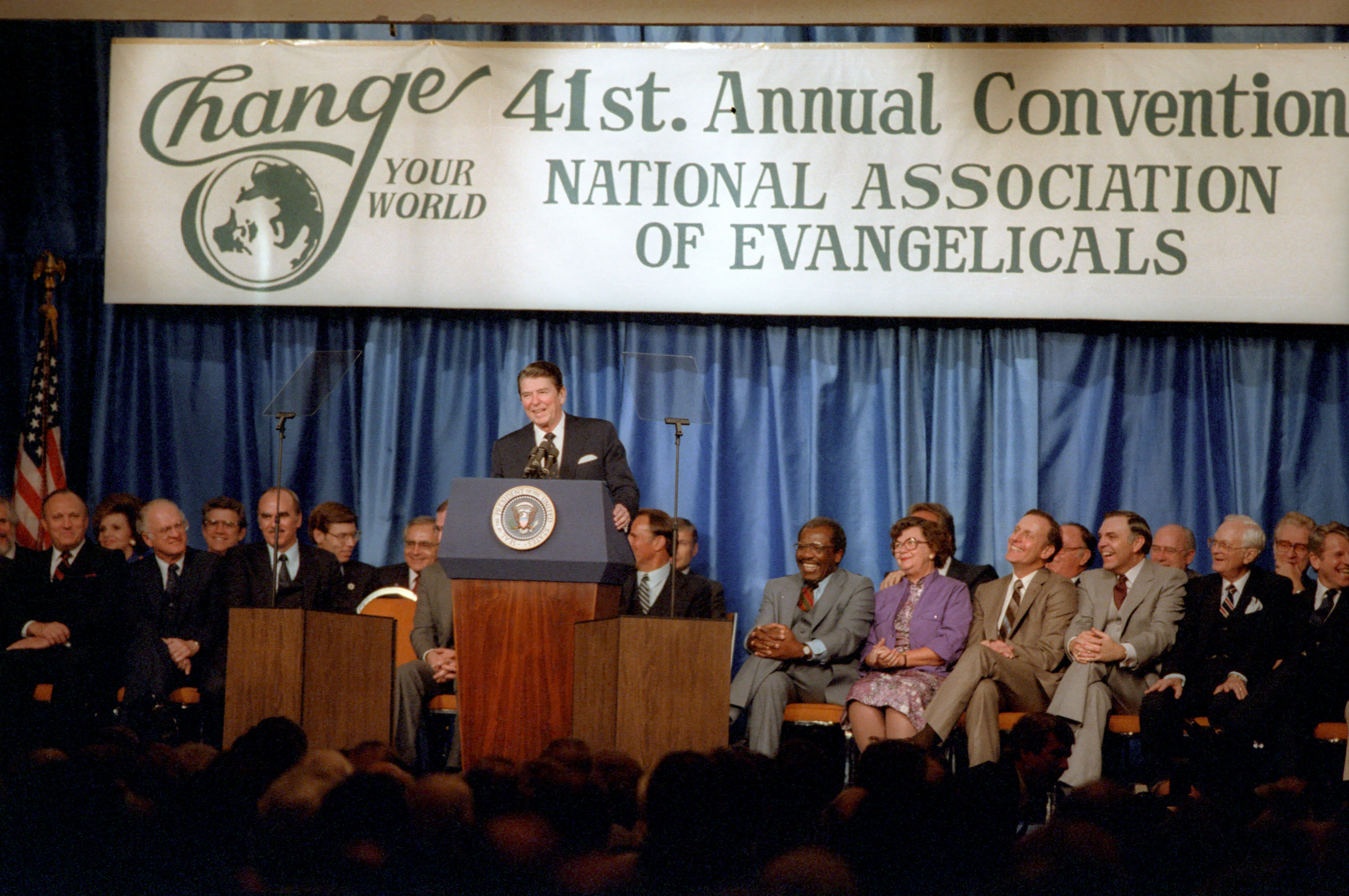
- Reagan in the Citrus Crown ballroom
- Date: March 8, 1983; 43 years ago
- Venue: Sheraton Twin Towers Hotel
- Location: Orlando, Florida, US
- Participants: Ronald Reagan
- The full text of the speech at Wikisource

The "Evil Empire" speech was a speech by then-United States president Ronald Reagan to the National Association of Evangelicals on March 8, 1983, at the height of the Cold War and the Soviet–Afghan War. In that speech, Reagan referred to the Soviet Union as an "evil empire" and as "the focus of evil in the modern world". Reagan explicitly rejected the notion that the United States and the Soviet Union were equally responsible for the Cold War and the ongoing nuclear arms race between the two nations; rather, he asserted that the conflict was a battle between good and evil.

== Background ==
Reagan's chief speechwriter at the time, Anthony R. Dolan, coined the phrase "evil empire" for Reagan's use. Dolan included similar language in a draft for Reagan's June 1982 speech before the British House of Commons in London, but reviewers flagged and struck the phrasing. On June 19, 1981, during a meeting with Singapore prime minister Lee Kuan Yew, Lee referred to the Soviet Union as an “empire which extended across Eurasia.” According to Lee’s memoirs, "Reagan's ears pricked up at the word 'empire.' He told Richard Allen to use that word more frequently when describing the Soviet domain." Dolan included the phrase "evil empire" in drafts for Reagan's speech at the National Association of Evangelicals' 41st annual convention. White House staffers who saw drafts of the speech, including David Gergen, repeatedly struck the "evil empire" portion; the speech eventually reached Reagan with the "evil empire" portion included, staffer critics concluding the event would be minor and unlikely to attract attention.

When Reagan reviewed and edited the draft himself, he extended the material on domestic matters. Dolan had included a reference to "abortion on demand" as a "great moral evil"; Reagan cut the line and added a remark asserting that "until it can be proven that the unborn child is not a living entity" its "right to life, liberty & the pursuit of happiness must be protected". Reagan left the "evil empire" phrase and did not substantially alter the draft's strongly anti-communist tone.

== Speech ==
Ronald Reagan's speech at the 41st annual convention of the National Association of Evangelicals on March 8, 1983.

Reagan spoke at the 41st annual convention of the National Association of Evangelicals on March 8, 1983, in the Citrus Crown Ballroom of the Sheraton Twin Towers Hotel in Orlando, Florida. The speech, marking his first recorded use of the phrase "evil empire" to refer to the Soviet Union, has become known as the "Evil Empire" speech. In that speech, Reagan said:

Yes, let us pray for the salvation of all of those who live in that totalitarian darkness—pray they will discover the joy of knowing God. But until they do, let us be aware that while they preach the supremacy of the State, declare its omnipotence over individual man, and predict its eventual domination of all peoples on the earth, they are the focus of evil in the modern world .... So, in your discussions of the nuclear freeze proposals, I urge you to beware the temptation of pride—the temptation of blithely declaring yourselves above it all and label both sides equally at fault, to ignore the facts of history and the aggressive impulses of an evil empire, to simply call the arms race a giant misunderstanding and thereby remove yourself from the struggle between right and wrong and good and evil.

The audience applauded Reagan's speech. A band played him off with the song "Onward, Christian Soldiers".

== Reception ==
Contemporaneous press criticized the speech as inflammatory, and critics worried the speech portended negatively for arms negotiations with the Soviet Union. The Christian Science Monitor argued that Reagan's rhetoric would encourage an arms race and "would some day, in logic, point toward war". During a 1984 presidential debate, Reagan reiterated his assessment of the Soviet Union, saying he "believe[d] that many of the things that they have done are evil in any concept of morality that we have", while also emphasizing pragmatism, adding, "I also recognize that as the two great superpowers in the world, we have to live with each other".

The Soviet Union, for its part, alleged that the United States was an imperialist superpower seeking to dominate the entire world, and that the Soviet Union was fighting against it "in the name of humanity". In Moscow, the Soviet state-run press agency TASS said the "evil empire" words demonstrated that the Reagan administration "can think only in terms of confrontation and bellicose, lunatic anti-communism".

During his second term in office, in May–June 1988, more than five years after using the term "evil empire", Reagan visited Mikhail Gorbachev, at the time General Secretary of the Soviet Union and a reformist, in Moscow. When asked by a reporter whether he still thought the Soviet Union was an evil empire, Reagan responded that he no longer did, and that when he used the term it was "another time, another era". In a speech, Gorbachev said of Reagan's statement that the Soviet Union "t[ook] note of that"; journalist Lou Cannon concluded that Gorbachev "listened carefully to the message of peace that Reagan had brought with him to Moscow".

== Interpretation ==
G. Thomas Goodnight characterized the "evil empire" speech, along with the "Zero Option" and "Star Wars" speeches, as part of the rhetorical side of the Cold War and reshaped public perceptions of nuclear warfare. In the former, Reagan depicted nuclear warfare as an extension of an "age old struggle between good and evil". By characterizing the Soviet Union as an "evil empire" and therefore irrational and untrustworthy, the speech justified demurrals on peace proposals. Historian John Lewis Gaddis called the speech the "complet[ion of] a rhetorical offensive designed to expose what Reagan saw as the central error of détente: the idea that the Soviet Union had earned geopolitical, ideological, economic, and moral legitimacy" and argued that it "could not have been better calculated to feed the anxieties" afflicting Soviet leadership at the time. According to literature professor Leerom Medovoi, on top of opposing the Soviet Union, the "Evil Empire" speech directed the Evangelical audience's attention to domestic policy and characterized American liberals as being additional enemies in a culture war that Reagan called "a test of moral will and faith".

== See also ==
- CRINK
- Axis of evil
- Chicken Kiev speech
- Speeches and debates of Ronald Reagan
- Tear down this wall!

== Sources ==
- Cannon, Lou (2000). President Reagan: The Role of a Lifetime (First PublicAffairs ed.). PublicAffairs. ISBN 1-891620-91-6.
- Cooper, James; Richardson, R. J.; Schwab, Bailey (2024). Ronald Reagan's 1984: Politics, Policy, and Culture. Palgrave Macmillan. doi:10.1007/978-3-031-53677-9. ISBN 978-3-031-53676-2.
- Davis, Donald A. (March 8, 1983). "President Reagan Warned Tuesday Against 'Simple-minded Appeasement'". United Press International.
- Gaddis, John Lewis (2005). The Cold War: A New History. Penguin Books. ISBN 1-59420-062-9.
- Goodnight, G. Thomas (1986). "Ronald Reagan's re-formulation of the rhetoric of war: Analysis of the 'zero option,' 'evil empire,' and 'star wars' addresses". Quarterly Journal of Speech. 72 (4): 390–414. doi:10.1080/00335638609383784.
- Harsch, Joseph C. (April 26, 1983). "Are Russians Human?". The Christian Science Monitor.
- Jones, Seth G. (2018). A Covert Action: Reagan, the CIA, and the Cold War Struggle in Poland. W. W. Norton. ISBN 978-0393247008.
- Medovoi, Leerom (2012). "The Race War Within: The Biopolitics of the Long Cold War". In Belletto, Steven; Grausam, Daniel (eds.). American Literature and Culture in an Age of Cold War: A Critical Reassessment. University of Iowa Press. pp. 163–186. ISBN 978-1-60938-113-4.
- Peterson, Jon Richard (June 2010). "An Evil Empire": The Rhetorical Rearmament of Ronald Reagan (PhD thesis). Ohio University.
- Rowland, Robert C.; Jones, John M. (October 2016). "Reagan's Strategy for the Cold War and the Evil Empire Address". Rhetoric & Public Affairs. 19 (3): 427–463. doi:10.14321/rhetpublaffa.19.3.0427. S2CID 151775200.
- Schlesinger, Robert (2008). White House Ghosts: Presidents and Their Speechwriters. Simon & Schuster. ISBN 978-0743291699.
