= Maucher =

Maucher is a surname. Notable people with the surname include:

- Eugen Maucher (1912-1991), German politician
- Helmut Maucher (1927–2018), German businessman
