= Stress testing =

Class of tests going beyond standard operation conditions

Stress testing is a form of deliberately intense or thorough testing, used to determine the stability of a given system, critical infrastructure or entity. It involves testing beyond normal operational capacity, often to a breaking point, in order to observe the results.

Reasons can include:

- to determine breaking points or safe usage limits
- to confirm mathematical model is accurate enough in predicting breaking points or safe usage limits
- to confirm intended specifications are being met
- to determine modes of failure (how exactly a system fails)
- to test stable operation of a part or system outside standard usage

Reliability engineers often test items under expected stress or even under accelerated stress in order to determine the operating life of the item or to determine modes of failure.

The term "stress" may have a more specific meaning in certain industries, such as material sciences, and therefore stress testing may sometimes have a technical meaning – one example is in fatigue testing for materials.

In animal biology, there are various forms of biological stress and biological stress testing, such as the cardiac stress test in humans, often administered for biomedical reasons. In exercise physiology, training zones are often determined in relation to metabolic stress protocols, quantifying energy production, oxygen uptake, or blood chemistry regimes.

== Computing ==
In computing, stress testing (sometimes called torture testing) can be applied to either hardware or software. It is used to determine the maximum capability of a computer system and is often used for purposes such as scaling for production use and ensuring reliability and stability. Stress tests typically involve running a large amount of resource-intensive processes until the system either crashes or nearly does

== Materials ==
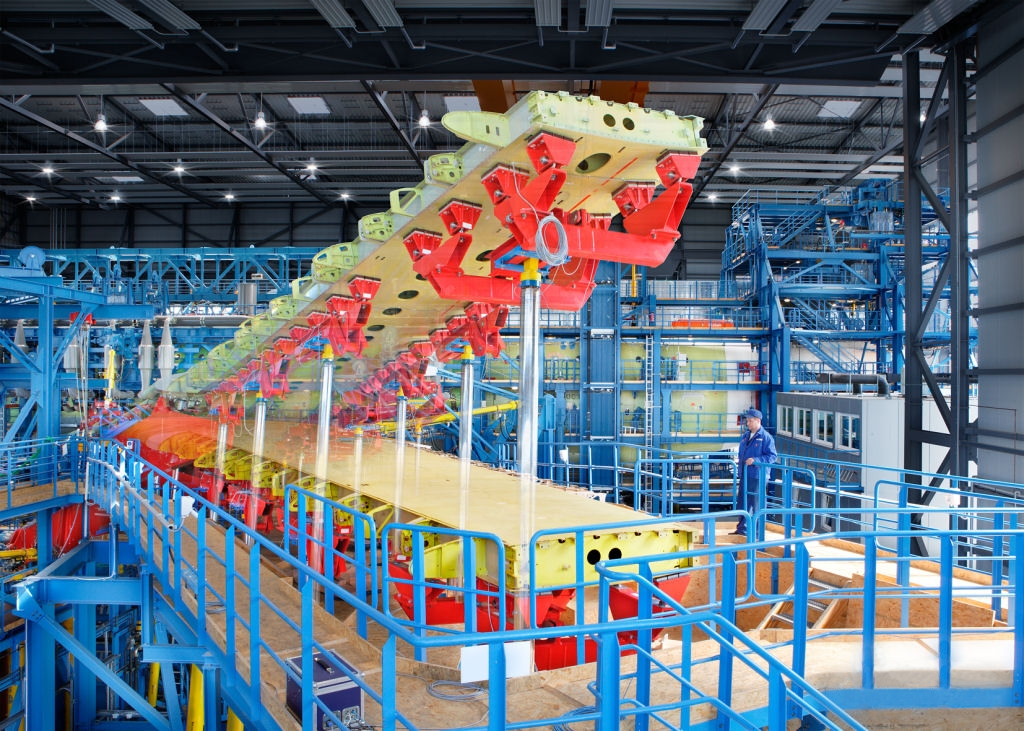
IABG Fatigue test of the Airbus A380 wing (showing the wing deflected upwards superimposed on the unloaded wing). The wing was tested for a total of 47500 flights which is 2.5 times the number of flights in 25 years of operation. Each 16 hour flight took 11 minutes to simulate on the fatigue test rig.

Fatigue testing is a specialised form of mechanical testing that is performed by applying cyclic loading to a coupon or structure. These tests are used either to generate fatigue life and crack growth data, identify critical locations or demonstrate the safety of a structure that may be susceptible to fatigue. Fatigue tests are used on a range of components from coupons through to full size test articles such as automobiles and aircraft.

Fatigue tests on coupons are typically conducted using servo hydraulic test machines which are capable of applying large variable amplitude cyclic loads. Constant amplitude testing can also be applied by simpler oscillating machines. The fatigue life of a coupon is the number of cycles it takes to break the coupon. This data can be used for creating stress-life or strain-life curves. The rate of crack growth in a coupon can also be measured, either during the test or afterward using fractography. Testing of coupons can also be carried out inside environmental chambers where the temperature, humidity and environment that may affect the rate of crack growth can be controlled.

Because of the size and unique shape of full size test articles, special test rigs are built to apply loads through a series of hydraulic or electric actuators. Actuators aim to reproduce the significant loads experienced by a structure, which in the case of aircraft, may consist of manoeuvre, gust, buffet and ground-air-ground (GAG) loading. A representative sample or block of loading is applied repeatedly until the safe life of the structure has been demonstrated or failures occur which need to be repaired. Instrumentation such as load cells, strain gauges and displacement gauges are installed on the structure to ensure the correct loading has been applied. Periodic inspections of the structure around critical stress concentrations such as holes and fittings are made to determine the time detectable cracks were found and to ensure any cracking that does occur, does not affect other areas of the test article. Because not all loads can be applied, any unbalanced structural loads are typically reacted out to the test floor through non-critical structure such as the undercarriage.

Airworthiness standards generally require a fatigue test to be carried out for large aircraft prior to certification to determine their safe life. Small aircraft may demonstrate safety through calculations, although typically larger scatter or safety factors are used because of the additional uncertainty involved.

== Critical infrastructure ==
Critical infrastructure (CI) such as highways, railways, electric power networks, dams, port facilities, major gas pipelines or oil refineries are exposed to multiple natural and human-induced hazards and stressors, including earthquakes, landslides, floods, tsunami, wildfires, climate change effects or explosions. These stressors and abrupt events can cause failures and losses, and hence, can interrupt essential services for the society and the economy. Therefore, CI owners and operators need to identify and quantify the risks posed by the CIs due to different stressors, in order to define mitigation strategies and improve the resilience of the CIs. Stress tests are advanced and standardised tools for hazard and risk assessment of CIs, that include both low-probability high-consequence (LP-HC) events and so-called extreme or rare events, as well as the systematic application of these new tools to classes of CI.

Stress testing is the process of assessing the ability of a CI to maintain a certain level of functionality under unfavourable conditions, while stress tests consider LP-HC events, which are not always accounted for in the design and risk assessment procedures, commonly adopted by public authorities or industrial stakeholders. A multilevel stress test methodology for CI has been developed in the framework of the European research project STREST, consisting of four phases:

Phase 1: Preassessment, during which the data available on the CI (risk context) and on the phenomena of interest (hazard context) are collected. The goal and objectives, the time frame, the stress test level and the total costs of the stress test are defined.

Phase 2: Assessment, during which the stress test at the component and the system scope is performed, including fragility and risk analysis of the CIs for the stressors defined in Phase 1. The stress test can result in three outcomes: Pass, Partly Pass and Fail, based on the comparison of the quantified risks to acceptable risk exposure levels and a penalty system.

Phase 3: Decision, during which the results of the stress test are analyzed according to the goal and objectives defined in Phase 1. Critical events (events that most likely cause the exceedance of a given level of loss) and risk mitigation strategies are identified.

Phase 4: Report, during which the stress test outcome and risk mitigation guidelines based on the findings established in Phase 3 are formulated and presented to the stakeholders.

This stress-testing methodology has been demonstrated to six CIs in Europe at component and system level: an oil refinery and petrochemical plant in Milazzo, Italy; a conceptual alpine earth-fill dam in Switzerland; the Baku–Tbilisi–Ceyhan pipeline in Turkey; part of the Gasunie national gas storage and distribution network in the Netherlands; the port infrastructure of Thessaloniki, Greece; and an industrial district in the region of Tuscany, Italy. The outcome of the stress testing included the definition of critical components and events and risk mitigation strategies, which are formulated and reported to stakeholders.

== Finance ==
In finance, a stress test is an analysis or simulation designed to determine the ability of a given financial instrument or financial institution to deal with an economic crisis. Instead of doing financial projection on a "best estimate" basis, a company or its regulators may do stress testing where they look at how robust a financial instrument is in certain crashes, a form of scenario analysis. They may test the instrument under, for example, the following stresses:

- What happens if unemployment rate rises to v% in a specific year?
- What happens if equity markets crash by more than w% this year?
- What happens if GDP falls by x% in a given year?
- What happens if interest rates go up by at least y%?
- What if half the instruments in the portfolio terminate their contracts in the fifth year?
- What happens if oil prices rise by z%?
- What happens if there is a polar vortex event in a particular region?

This type of analysis has become increasingly widespread, and has been taken up by various governmental bodies (such as the PRA in the UK or inter-governmental bodies such as the European Banking Authority (EBA) and the International Monetary Fund) as a regulatory requirement on certain financial institutions to ensure adequate capital allocation levels to cover potential losses incurred during extreme, but plausible, events. The EBA's regulatory stress tests have been referred to as "a walk in the park" by Saxo Bank's Chief Economist. This emphasis on adequate, risk adjusted determination of capital has been further enhanced by modifications to banking regulations such as Basel II. Stress testing models typically allow not only the testing of individual stressors, but also combinations of different events. There is also usually the ability to test the current exposure to a known historical scenario (such as the Russian debt default in 1998 or 9/11 attacks) to ensure the liquidity of the institution. In 2014, 25 banks failed in a stress test conducted by EBA.

== Medical ==
=== Cardiac ===
A cardiac stress test is a cardiological examination that evaluates the cardiovascular system's response to external stress within a controlled clinical setting. This stress response can be induced through physical exercise (usually a treadmill) or intravenous pharmacological stimulation of heart rate.

As the heart works progressively harder (stressed) it is monitored using an electrocardiogram (ECG) monitor. This measures the heart's electrical rhythms and broader electrophysiology. Pulse rate, blood pressure and symptoms such as chest discomfort or fatigue are simultaneously monitored by attending clinical staff. Clinical staff will question the patient throughout the procedure asking questions that relate to pain and perceived discomfort. Abnormalities in blood pressure, heart rate, ECG or worsening physical symptoms could be indicative of coronary artery disease.

Stress testing does not accurately diagnose all cases of coronary artery disease, and can often indicate that it exists in people who do not have the condition. The test can also detect heart abnormalities such as arrhythmias, and conditions affecting electrical conduction within the heart such as various types of fascicular blocks.

A "normal" stress test does not offer any substantial reassurance that a future unstable coronary plaque will not rupture and block an artery, inducing a heart attack. As with all medical diagnostic procedures, data is only from a moment in time. A primary reason stress testing is not perceived as a robust method of CAD detection — is that stress testing generally only detects arteries that are severely narrowed (~70% or more).

=== Childbirth ===
A contraction stress test (CST) is performed near the end of pregnancy (34 weeks' gestation) to determine how well the fetus will cope with the contractions of childbirth. The aim is to induce contractions and monitor the fetus to check for heart rate abnormalities using a cardiotocograph. A CST is one type of antenatal fetal surveillance technique.

During uterine contractions, fetal oxygenation is worsened. Late decelerations in fetal heart rate occurring during uterine contractions are associated with increased fetal death rate, growth retardation and neonatal depression. This test assesses fetal heart rate in response to uterine contractions via electronic fetal monitoring. Uterine activity is monitored by tocodynamometer.

== See also ==
- Highly accelerated life test, generally for electronic equipment
- Fatigue (material)
- Stress (mechanics)
- Stress measures, ways to quantify mechanical stress
- Structural testing
- Worst-case scenario, often associated with stress testing
- List of bank stress tests, lists major bank stress testing programs with links to details by year
