= Comprehensive Capital Analysis and Review =

United States regulatory framework

Comprehensive Capital Analysis and Review (CCAR) is a United States regulatory framework introduced by the Federal Reserve in 2009 to assess, regulate, and supervise large banks and financial institutions – collectively referred to in the framework as bank holding companies (BHCs). It was an extension of the stress tests performed during the 2008 financial crisis.

The assessment is conducted annually and comprises two related programs:

1. Comprehensive Capital Analysis and Review
2. Dodd–Frank Act supervisory stress testing

The core part of the program assesses whether:

1. BHCs possess adequate capital.
2. The capital structure is stable given various stress-test scenarios.
3. Planned capital distributions, such as dividends and share repurchases, are viable and acceptable in relation to regulatory minimum capital requirements.

The assessment is performed on both qualitative and quantitative bases. The Federal Reserve may order banks to suspend their planned capital distributions to shareholders until the target capital balance is restored. Since 2009 many banks have failed CCAR on both qualitative and quantitive grounds.

== Dodd–Frank Act supervisory stress testing ==
Dodd–Frank Act imposes forward-looking stress testing of a bank's capital structure on a quantitative basis via models. Model risk management guidance has been provided by the Federal Reserve and the Office of the Comptroller of Currency in SR 11-7. A significant portion of banks' total effort spent on CCAR is devoted to compliance with SR 11-7, as the standards set within this guidance are stringent.

The Federal Reserve publishes three supervisory scenarios annually which each BHC must model: baseline, adverse, and severely adverse. These scenarios contain numeric values of macroeconomic indicators describing potential global economic scenarios two years (nine quarters) into the future. According to the Federal Reserve, each scenario represents the following:

The baseline scenario will reflect the most recently available consensus views of the macroeconomic outlook expressed by professional forecasters, government agencies, and other public-sector organizations as of the beginning of the annual stresstest cycle. The severely adverse scenario will consist of a set of economic and financial conditions that reflect the conditions of post-war U.S. recessions. The adverse scenario will consist of a set of economic and financial conditions that are more adverse than those associated with the baseline scenario but less severe than those associated with the severely adverse scenario.

The BHCs are responsible for designing their own scenarios to ensure capital adequacy for both the annual and mid-cycle stress tests.

Results of each stress test are reported by the BHCs in the FR Y-14A. This report contains the banks projections for 9 forward looking quarters on the same schedule as the FR Y-9C, which contains the BHCs actual results for the prior 4 quarters. Within the report are schedules for pre-provision net revenues (PPNR), balance sheet, risk weighted assets (RWA), Leverage Exposure, among others.

The Federal Reserve publishes a summary of each year's results. (until 2020) and

== See also ==
- Stress test (financial)
- Capital requirement
- Too big to fail
- Systemic risk
- Financial risk management § Banking
- Basel III
- Leverage
