= Zeitenwende speech =

2022 speech by German Chancellor Olaf Scholz

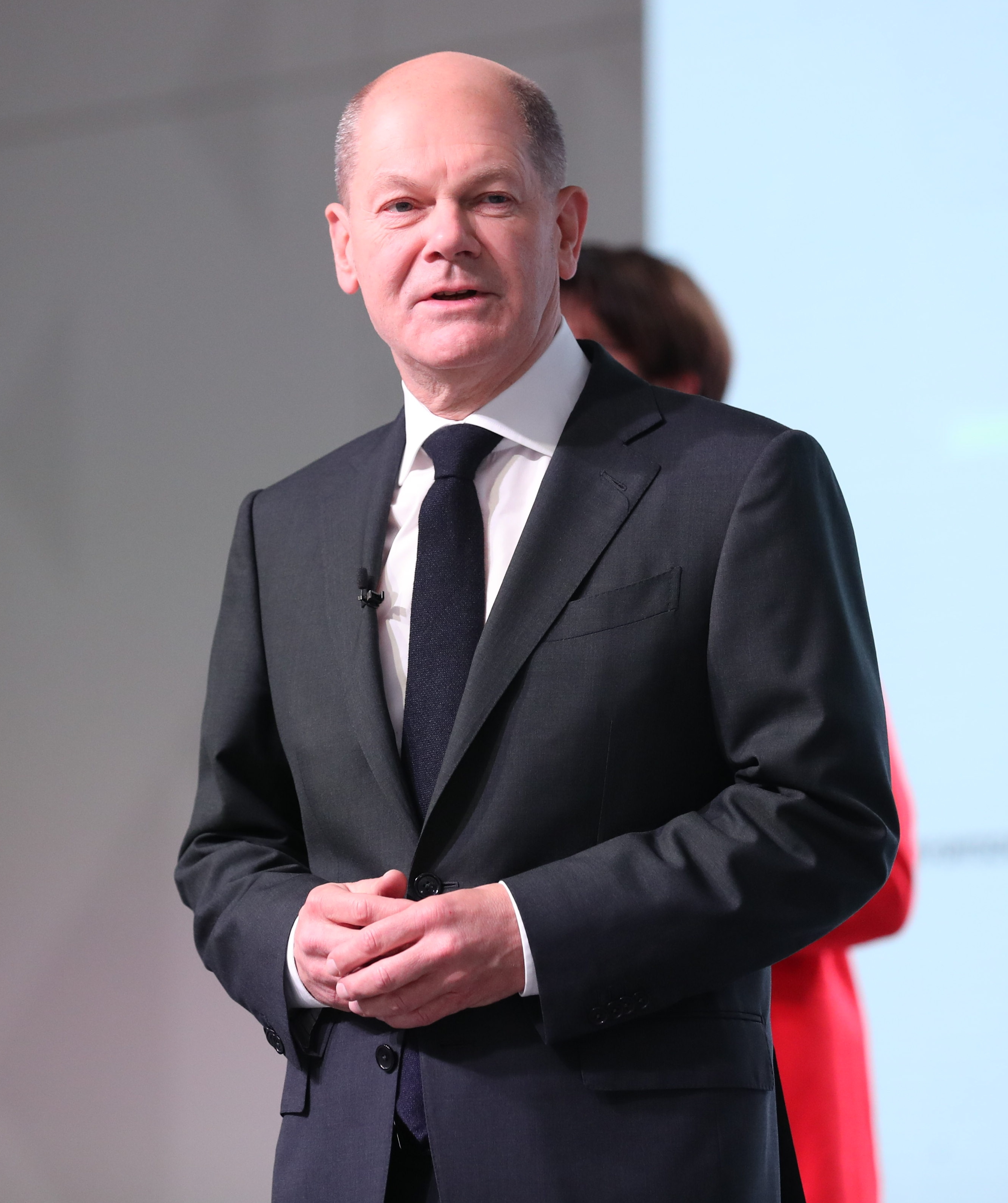
Olaf Scholz, pictured about two months before delivering the Zeitenwende speech

The Zeitenwende speech was an address delivered to the Bundestag by Olaf Scholz, the Chancellor of Germany, on 27 February 2022. His speech was a reaction to the Russian invasion of Ukraine on 24 February. Scholz described the attack as a "historic turning point" (German: Zeitenwende, literally: "times-turn", referring to the change from one age or era to another) and announced that in response his government would use a €100 billion off-budget fund to significantly increase military spending, reversing Germany's previously cautious defence policy.

Scholz's speech was well-received by most German and international politicians, and was endorsed by the leader of the opposition Friedrich Merz. The speech represented a major turning point for Germany’s policies in the areas of energy, relations with Russia, and security.

== Background ==
In the early months of 2022, Russia built up a military presence of around 150,000 troops near the Ukrainian border while demanding a commitment from the Western military alliance NATO that Ukraine would not be admitted to its membership. Western governments rejected this demand and reacted by increasing their military aid to Ukraine. Germany, whose government was led by the recently elected chancellor Olaf Scholz, was criticised for taking a cautious approach to the crisis. The criticism focused on Scholz's refusal to specify whether certification of Nord Stream 2, a gas pipeline financed by the Russian energy corporation Gazprom, would be suspended in the event of a Russian attack on Ukraine. On 15 February, Scholz met the Russian President Vladimir Putin for talks in Moscow. Scholz's visit was interpreted by some commentators as a sign of German weakness towards Russia. On 22 February, Scholz announced that his government would prevent the pipeline's certification after Putin ordered troops into eastern Ukraine.

On 24 February 2022, Russia launched an invasion of Ukraine from its built-up positions in southern Russia and Belarus. The invasion was described by Putin as a "special military operation" to aid the Donetsk People's Republic and the Luhansk People's Republic, two separatist territories in Ukraine's Donbas region that had requested Russia's help. Western leaders harshly condemned the attack.

As a country poor in natural resources and economy greatly relying on export, Germany was particularly affected.

== Speech on 27 February ==
On 27 February, Scholz addressed the Bundestag, Germany's lower house of parliament, to outline his government's reaction to Russia's invasion of Ukraine. He announced a fundamental restructuring of the country's cautious defence policy: Scholz vowed to set up an extraordinary fund of €100 billion to be invested in the modernisation of the German armed forces, the Bundeswehr. He also promised that defence spending would exceed 2% of gross domestic product (GDP), a requirement of NATO membership that Scholz's Social Democratic Party of Germany (SPD) had traditionally opposed. Scholz justified his departure from established defence policy with the threat posed by Russia to peace in Europe. He described the new political situation on the continent as a "historic turning point" German: Zeitenwende, literally: times-turn), saying:

Wir erleben eine Zeitenwende. Und das bedeutet: Die Welt danach ist nicht mehr dieselbe wie die Welt davor. Im Kern geht es um die Frage, ob Macht das Recht brechen darf, ob wir es Putin gestatten, die Uhren zurückzudrehen in die Zeit der Großmächte des 19. Jahrhunderts, oder ob wir die Kraft aufbringen, Kriegstreibern wie Putin Grenzen zu setzen. Das setzt eigene Stärke voraus.

We are living through a watershed era. And that means that the world afterwards will no longer be the same as the world before. The issue at the heart of this is whether power is allowed to prevail over the law. Whether we permit Putin to turn back the clock to the nineteenth century and the age of the great powers. Or whether we have it in us to keep warmongers like Putin in check. That requires strength of our own.

== Policy changes ==
In 2024, the country reached NATO’s target of spending two percent or more of its GDP on defense. Politicians and commentators generally regard German policy since the speech as a reversal of its earlier Wandel durch Handel (“peace through trade”) approach to Russia.

=== Arms shipments to Ukraine ===
By September 2022, Germany had sent "30 Gepard anti-aircraft tanks, 10 Panzerhaubitze 2000 howitzers and three MARS multiple rocket launchers, as well as various lighter weapons," to support Ukraine. This represented the first time since the World War II that the country had sent weapons into a conflict zone.

Through 2022, the government continued to delay the provision of heavy weapons, resisting opposition pressure to provide German-made Leopard battle tanks and Marder infantry fighting vehicles. On 5 January 2023, Scholz partially reversed this policy: he issued a joint press release with Joe Biden, the President of the United States, announcing that their countries would supply Ukraine with Marders and Bradley Fighting Vehicles respectively. Scholz also committed to sending a Patriot air defence system as a reaction to Russia's continued attacks on Ukraine's critical infrastructure. Later that month, in response to mounting pressure to provide tanks, Germany announced it would allow allied states to export Leopard tanks to Ukraine and would supply 14 Leopard 2A6 tanks from its own Bundeswehr inventory. By late March 2023, 18 such tanks had arrived Ukraine.

== Reception ==
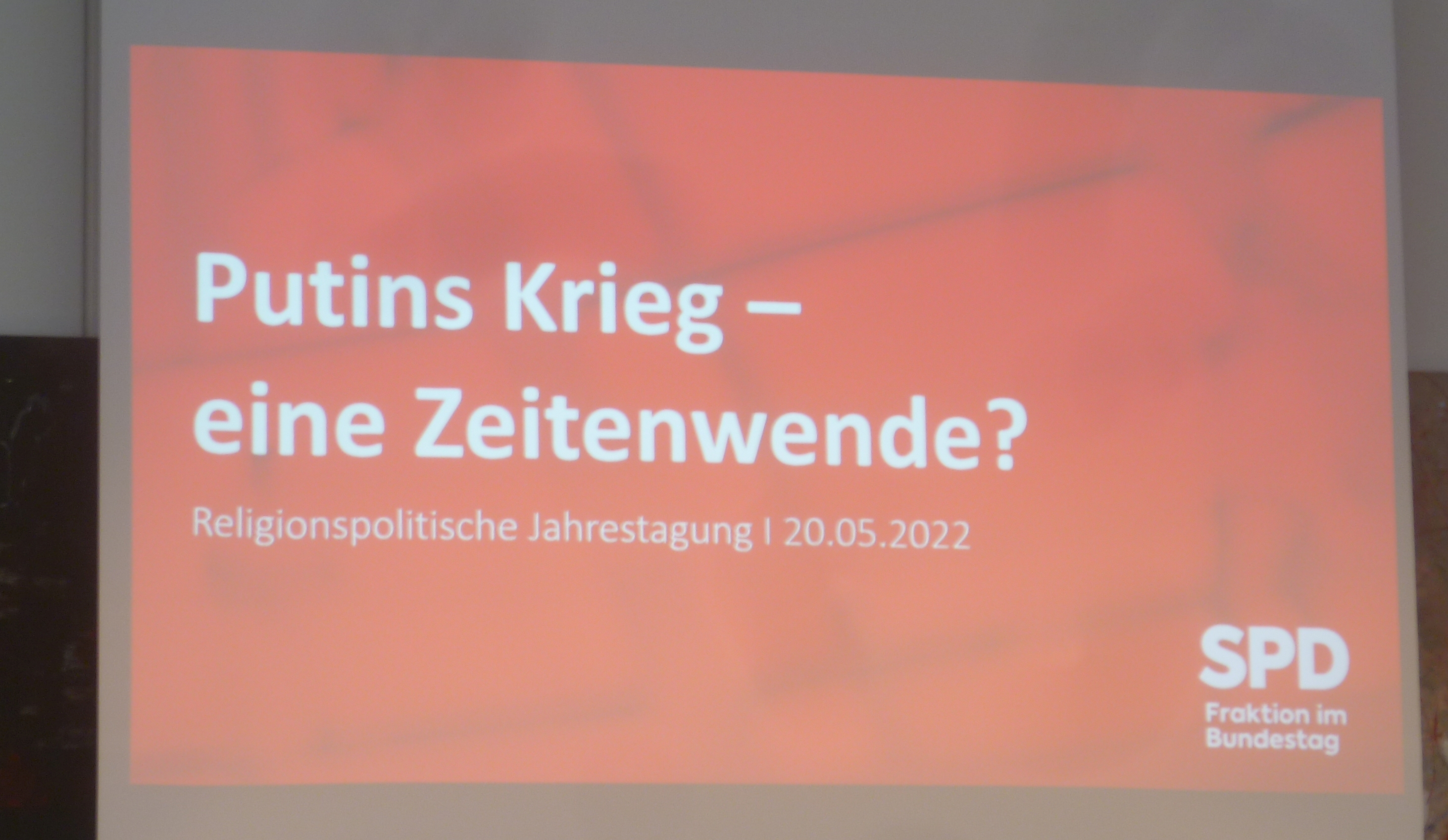
Slide from a presentation at the 2022 SPD party conference entitled 'Putin's war – a historical turning point?'

The speech was received positively by most German and international politicians. The Bundestag passed a motion of condemnation against the Russian government with the support of all parties except The Left and Alternative for Germany (AfD). Friedrich Merz, the leader of the opposition Christian Democratic Union of Germany (CDU), vowed to support Scholz's defence agenda, while he characterised the previous attitude of the chancellor's party as pro-Russian. Robert Habeck, the Minister for Economic Affairs, endorsed the new policy and admitted to mistakes in Germany's previous assessment of Russia. Jens Stoltenberg, Secretary General of NATO, praised Germany's new commitment to collective security, describing Scholz's promises as "a significant investment in security and freedom for our nations". According to a poll, 78% of Germans supported the proposed policies.

Even though the party shared Scholz's condemnation of Russia, the Left Party criticised the proposed increase in military spending. The party's chairwoman Amira Mohamed Ali accused the chancellor of engaging in an arms race that would prove detrimental to international security. Alice Weidel of AfD contradicted Scholz and asserted that NATO had committed an "historic mistake" in "aggrieving Russia" by entertaining the possibility of Ukrainian membership. As Scholz resisted the transfer of heavy weaponry to Ukraine, parts of the governing coalition began challenging the chancellor in parliament.

Writing for The Guardian, Patrick Wintour described Scholz's proposals as a "180-degree course correction" and wrote that Germany had become "not just an economic but also a geopolitical powerhouse" overnight. Sergey Lagodinsky, a Member of the European Parliament, argued that, in addition to its increased military spending, Germany needed to learn how to wield military intervention as a tool of foreign policy. He considered the country's close energy ties with Russia "one of the biggest strategic mistakes of the past 20 years". In August 2022, The Economist credited the Zeitenwende speech with facilitating the modification of long-held positions in politics and society. The newspaper reckoned that Germany now had the potential to become a "country comfortable with asserting itself using its armed forces". It also linked Scholz's new defence agenda to a new energy policy that could see Germany become less dependent on Russian gas, a scenario it described as "one of Vladimir Putin's biggest [potential] regrets".

The term Zeitenwende became a political catchphrase in the aftermath of the speech and was chosen the German word of the year 2022.

Around the anniversary of the speech, some have criticized a perceived gap between Scholz's words and subsequent actions. Minister-President of Bavaria Markus Söder criticized Scholz by stating "everyone is talking about Zeitenwende, but so far we’ve only seen Zeitlupe [slow motion]". Matthew Karnitschnig of Politico commented that "it's become clear that the best way to describe Scholz's much-ballyhooed slogan is with a blunt Americanism: bullshit". Confronted with similar criticisms by CNN's Fareed Zakaria, Scholz emphasized Germany's aid to Ukraine and the successful decoupling from Russian energy dependence, while stating it "is absolutely clear we will go to two percent of GDP [in military spending]" and that starting necessary military production takes time.

== Effects ==
As of early 2025, the overall picture is mixed.

In the area of energy, Germany's hydrocarbon dependency on Russia had ended, with little chance of returning to the status quo ante bellum. However, the resulting high energy prices had contributed to the economic stagnation. Although Germany had managed to avoid broad deindustrialization, energy-intensive industry, especially plants directly dependent on natural gas for as a source of heat or feedstock, had partially fled the country.

Germany had become the biggest European provider of support for Ukraine, but is unlikely to succeed in building up its army to the targeted 203,000 personnel strength. As the off-budget €100 billion Sondervermögen Bundeswehr fund money runs out, a creation of a new, and larger size, fund becomes inevitable, with the alternative being a significant expansion of the defense budget.

Although Chancellor Scholz's 2022 Zeitenwende speech was accompanied by a €100 billion special fund to modernize the Bundeswehr, implementation has faced significant obstacles. By 2025, critics noted that despite initial procurement efforts—such as F-35A fighters, upgraded Puma IFVs, and naval frigates—the Bundeswehr remained under-equipped and strategically limited.

== See also ==
- History of German foreign policy
- List of humanitarian aid to Ukraine during the Russo-Ukrainian War
- Nord Stream
- Russia in the European energy sector

== Bibliography ==
- Becker, Kristin (27 February 2022). "Entschlossen wie nie". Tagesschau (in German). ARD. Archived from the original on 15 August 2022.
- "Deutschland reagiert auf Putins Aggression". Süddeutsche Zeitung (in German). Deutsche Presse-Agentur. 27 February 2022. Archived from the original on 24 August 2022.
- "Germany is facing dramatic change in many dimensions all at once". The Economist. 11 August 2022. Archived from the original on 21 September 2022.
- "Regierungserklärung von Bundeskanzler Olaf Scholz am 27. Februar 2022" (in German). Federal Government of Germany. 27 February 2022. Archived from the original on 19 September 2022.
- Riley, Charles; Horowitz, Julia (23 February 2022). "Germany halts Nord Stream 2 and Russia responds with a stark warning". CNN Business. Archived from the original on 20 September 2022.
- "Russian forces launch full-scale invasion of Ukraine". Al Jazeera. 24 February 2022. Archived from the original on 24 February 2022.
- Vock, Ido (16 February 2022). "Olaf Scholz is getting tougher on Russia, if only his allies would notice". New Statesman. Archived from the original on 15 August 2022.
- Wintour, Patrick (4 March 2022). "The week where decades happened: how the west finally woke up to Putin". The Guardian. Archived from the original on 13 August 2022.
- "Policy statement by Olaf Scholz, Chancellor of the Federal Republic of Germany and Member of the German Bundestag, 27 February 2022 in Berlin". Federal Government of Germany. 27 February 2022.
- Harding, Luke (17 November 2022). "The night everything changed: waiting for Russia's invasion of Ukraine". The Guardian.
- von der Burchard, Hans (22 September 2022). "Pressure mounts on Germany's Scholz to send tanks to Ukraine : Even his own coalition partners are telling him it's time to send more heavy weapons to fight Putin". Politico. Archived from the original on 25 September 2022.
- "»Zeitenwende« ist das Wort des Jahres 2022". Der Spiegel (in German). 9 December 2022.
- Alexander, Robin (4 December 2022). "Ein Jahr Ampel: In der Multi-Krise wird erkennbar, woran Scholz sich klammert". Die Welt (in German).
- Richter, Nicolas (5 January 2023). "Biden und Scholz geben gemeinsame Erklärung ab". Süddeutsche Zeitung (in German).
- "Deutschland liefert 14 "Leopard"-Panzer". Tagesschau (in German).
- Deni, John R.; Henke, Marina E.; Matlé, Aylin; Besch, Sophia; Bosch, Tim; Campbell, Loyle; Stent, Angela E; Rathke, Jeffrey D.; Luetkefend, Theresa; Stumbaum, May-Britt U.; de Cet, Sharon (2025). Assessing the Zeitenwende: Implications for Germany, the United States, and Transatlantic Security. Carlisle Barracks, PA: US Army War College Press.
