= Agricultural Bank of Greece =

Greek commercial bank

Agricultural Bank of Greece S.A. Αγροτική Τράπεζα της Ελλάδος
- Demeter, Greek goddess of agriculture, is depicted on the logo
- Type: Anonymi Etairia
- Industry: Financial services
- Founded: 1929; 97 years ago (as Agricultural Bank of Greece)
- Defunct: 2012
- Headquarters: Athens, Greece
- Products: Retail and business banking, insurance, fund management
- Revenue: €806.5 million (2010)
- Operating income: €438.0 million (2010)
- Net income: €395.3 million (2010)
- Total assets: €31.22 billion (end 2010)
- Total equity: €749.4 million (end 2010)
- Number of employees: 8,915 (end 2010)
- Parent: Piraeus Bank
- Website: atebank.gr (archived)

The Agricultural Bank of Greece was a commercial bank based in Athens, Greece. The bank was founded in 1929. The bank proclaimed that it would focus on the Balkan bank market, with the business activities of supporting of the agricultural sector. ATEbank held a strong position at Athens Stock Exchange and has become a member of Piraeus Bank in the year 2013.

The Bank's development of business activities called for a new name and corporate image as ATEbank.

== History ==
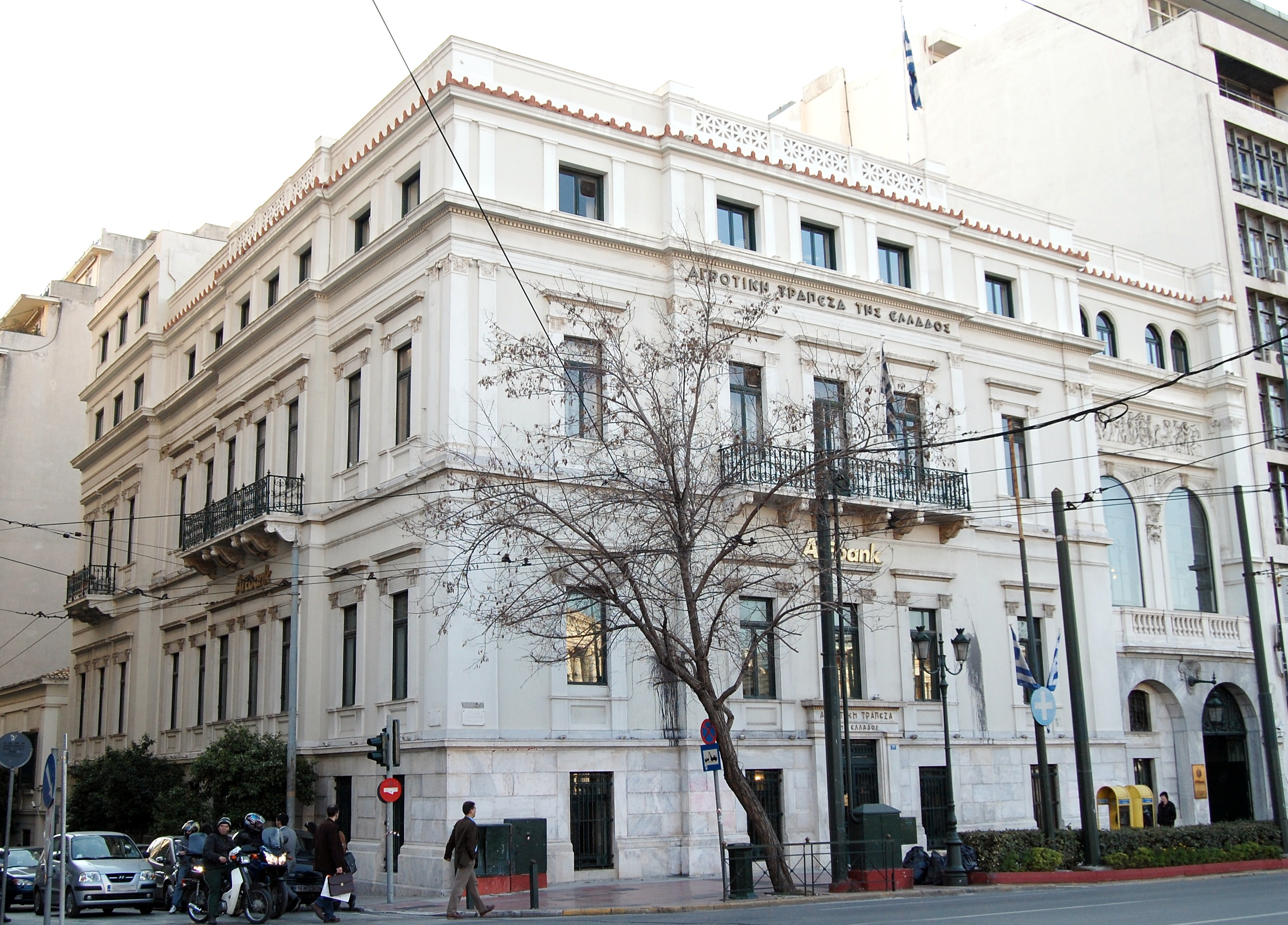
The historical Sarpieri mansion, now building of the Agricultural Bank of Greece (ATEBank).

1929 / Foundation. Agricultural Bank of Greece is founded as a non-profit organisation, provider of credit to the agricultural sector. The bank mainly aims at implementing programmes for financing both the activities of the primary sector of the economy and the processing and marketing of agricultural products, and enhancing rural development.

1950 Expansion of activities in the agricultural sector. Agricultural Bank founds a number of companies, which produce farming products and exploit resources all over the country.

1990 Expansion of activities in the non-agricultural sector. Agricultural Bank of Greece expands in the non-agricultural sector, by developing both a broad branch network all over Greece and a variety of new financial products and services.

1991 Transition to S.A. Agricultural Bank becomes S.A., broadens the spectrum of banking and financial services and acquires participating interests in specialised financial companies, thereby expanding the ABG group of companies.

2000 Entrance in the Athens Stock Exchange. Agricultural Bank increases its capital in order to enter Athens Stock Exchange, where its shares are listed since January 2001

2004 - 2006 Strengthening of the corporate image and positioning of the bank. The Bank by implementing a wide range of reforms and restructuring programs, and developing its branch network competitiveness and productivity, manages to achieve high growth rates which are depicted in the financial statements of both the Bank and the Group.

In particular:

An increase in the Bank's share capital took place, amounting to €1.25 billion (June 2005). This capital increase allowed the Bank to deal with the problems encountered after adopting the International Accounting Standards (IAS) and has hence contributed to the substantial reorganization of the Bank's financial statements. The Bank implemented the Panotokia Law, which benefited in total 63.220 debtors of whom 54.000 were farmers. Loans written off amounted to EUR 1.8 billion of which EUR 1.1 billion concerned debts of farmers. In November 2005, the share of the Bank became a constituent of the FTSE/Athex 20 Index. The Bank's corporate identity was changed in association with the new logo “ΑΤΕbank” on the branches and ATMs. The Board of Directors distributed for the first time a dividend per share out of the profit for the year 2005. The Bank expands in the Balkans’ area by purchasing MINDΒank (July 2006) and getting permission for bancassurance operations in Romania.

In July 2010 the bank failed the Eurozone stress test which required 6% Tier 1 capital to be maintained after the test. An increase in the Bank's share capital took place in July 2011, amounting to €1.3 billion.

The good parts of the bank were taken over by Piraeus Bank in 2012, but its branches continued to bear the ATEbank corporate image until the summer of 2013.

== Expansion ==
=== Romania ===
As a part of strategy of expansion in Balkan in 2006 ATEbank acquired majority stake in Romania's Mind Bank.

=== Serbia ===
On 11.09.2006 ATE Bank announced it had acquired 24.99 pct of common and 24.99 pct of preferential shares of Serbia's Aik Bank, Niš for an undisclosed amount. AIK Bank Nis is listed on the Belgrade Stock Exchange, it's the most profitable bank in Serbia and has a 3 pct market share.

== See also ==
- List of banks in Greece
