= Zero Option =

The "Zero Option" was the name given to an American proposal for the withdrawal of all Soviet and United States intermediate-range nuclear missiles from Europe. This term was subsequently expanded to describe the vision of eliminating all nuclear weapons everywhere.

== Reagan's initial proposal and reactions ==
U.S. President Ronald Reagan proposed this plan on 18 November 1981. He offered not to proceed with the deployment of Pershing II and cruise missiles – previously announced on 12 December 1979 and due to begin in 1983 – if the Soviet Union would remove its SS-4, SS-5 and SS-20 missiles targeted on Western Europe.

European and American anti-nuclear activists denounced the Zero Option as designed to be rejected so that the U.S. could deploy the new missiles without condemnation by critics there and abroad. Reagan's proposal came to widespread public attention especially in Germany, where the translated term Nullösung was chosen as Word of the Year 1981 by the Gesellschaft für deutsche Sprache.

Following the coming to power of Mikhail Gorbachev, however, nuclear arms control negotiations were resumed, and the Zero Option constituted the basis of the Intermediate-Range Nuclear Forces Treaty, agreed in principle in September 1987 and signed on 8 December that year.

== Later similar disarmament concepts ==
Reagan's vision toward the elimination of nuclear weapons went far beyond the goals of the INF treaty. On January 16, 1984, he delivered a speech saying:

Our aim was and continues to be to eliminate an entire class of nuclear arms. Indeed, I support a zero option for all nuclear arms. As I've said before, my dream is to see the day when nuclear weapons will be banished from the face of the Earth.

The final total of Soviet and United States nuclear missiles, eliminated under the terms of the INF Treaty by the end of May 1991, was 2,692. The fulfilment of this multilateral agreement, which removed both intermediate- and shorter-range nuclear forces from Europe (the "Double-Zero" deal), was widely seen as a key step towards ending the Cold War.

== 21st-century effort ==
The push for total nuclear weapons abolition was promoted again by U.S. President Barack Obama in a speech given on April 4, 2009, in Prague, where he announced ...

America's commitment to seek the peace and security of a world without nuclear weapons.

Obama went on in that speech to state:

Just as we stood for freedom in the 20th century, we must stand together for the right of people everywhere to live free from fear in the 21st century. -- And as nuclear power — as a nuclear power, as the only nuclear power to have used a nuclear weapon, the United States has a moral responsibility to act. We cannot succeed in this endeavor alone. But we can lead it. We can start it. So today, I state clearly and with conviction, America's commitment to seek the peace and security of a world without nuclear weapons. -- I'm not naive. This goal will not be reached quickly, perhaps not in my lifetime. It will take patience and persistence. But now we too, must ignore the voices who tell us that the world cannot change. We have to insist, 'Yes, we can.'

== See also ==
- Nuclear disarmament
