= Helmut Maucher =

German businessman (1927–2018)

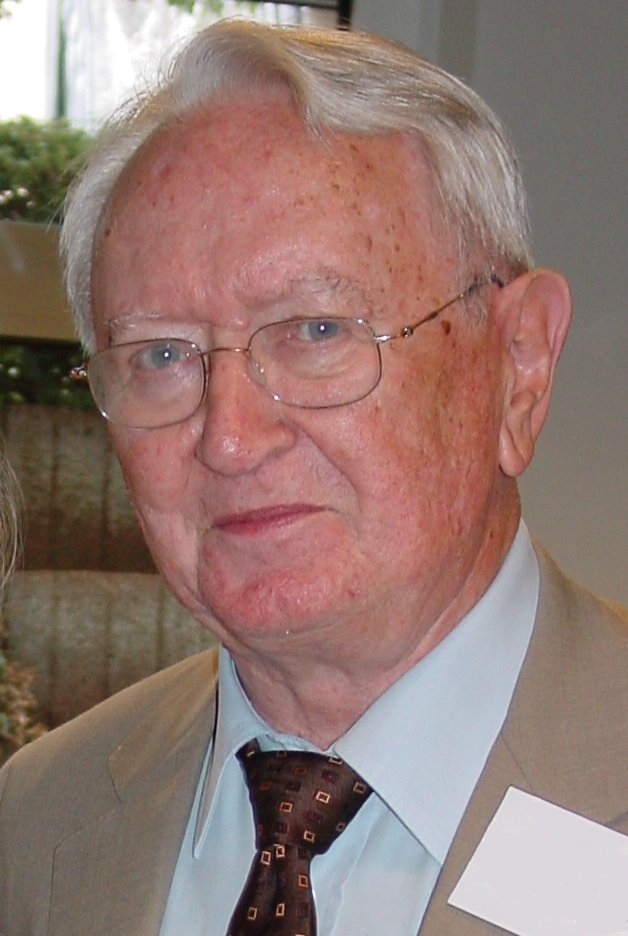
- Maucher in 2007
- Born: 9 December 1927; Eisenharz, Weimar Germany
- Died: 5 March 2018 (aged 90); Bad Homburg, Germany
- Education: Frankfurt University
- Occupation: Business executive

Helmut Oswald Maucher (9 December 1927 – 5 March 2018) was a German businessman. He was the CEO of Nestlé from 1981 to 1997. He joined the company at a young age, completing an apprenticeship at the Nestlé factory in Eisenharz, Germany just after finishing high school. He was honorary chairman of Nestlé SA, Vevey, Switzerland, having been elected to that position by the board after relinquishing its chairmanship in May 2000.

== Early life ==
Helmut Maucher was born on 9 December 1927 in Eisenharz (Allgäu), Germany. When he was 19, Nestlé AG bought the milk production company in Eisenharz for which he and his father worked. After finishing his A-levels, he began a business apprenticeship for the same company. He went on to work at Nestlé Frankfurt while studying business administration at Frankfurt University, and later graduated with a master's degree in business/commerce.

== Career ==
Between 1964 and 1980 he occupied different management positions at Nestlé Frankfurt. In 1975, he became General Director of the Nestlé Group Germany. On 1 October 1980 he was asked to move to Switzerland to become General Director of the whole Nestlé Group and a member of the executive committee.

In November 1981 he became delegate of the supervisory administration board of Nestlé AG in Vevey. Between 1990 and 1997 he was both president and delegate of the supervisory administration board. In this time he expanded the company to the largest food company worldwide with 260,000 employees. After stepping down from his position as delegate in 1997, he continued to be president of the supervisory administration board until 2000, which is when he was given the position of honorary president. He was the first non-Swiss to be given such an honour and position in a major Swiss company.

Maucher was on the board of trustees of the Frankfurt Institute for Advanced Studies.

== Controversy ==
In a 1997 interview, Maucher stated: "There is a certain percentage of prosperity waste (German: Wohlstandsmüll) in our society; people who are either unmotivated, semi-invalid, tired or who just take advantage of the system." Maucher was alluding to the highly developed German welfare system, which in his opinion removed the necessity to take employment. He was subsequently criticized for the usage of the term "waste" as a description for human beings, which culminated in Wohlstandsmüll having been chosen as the German Un-Word of the Year 1997 by a jury of linguistic scholars.

== Honours and distinctions ==
- Gold Medal – Fortune Magazine, 1984
- Grand Merit Cross of the Federal Republic of Germany (Grosses Verdienstkreuz) – 1988
- Doctor honoris causa, University of Guadalajara, Mexico - June 1989
- Order of the Aztec Eagle – Mexico, April 1993
- Grand Gold Medal with Star for Services to the Republic of Austria – August 1993
- Leadership Award for Corporate Statesmanship, International Institute for Management Development (IMD) – October 1993
- IMD, Maucher Nestlé Chair, November 1993
- Appeal of Conscience Foundation Award, New York – October 1995
- INTERNORGA prize, Hamburg – March 1996
- Doctor honoris causa, European Business School Oestrich Winkel – Feb 1997
- Business Hall of Fame, Manager Magazine – May 1997
- Grand Cross of Merit with Star of the Federal Republic of Germany – September 1997
- Order of Merit of Baden-Württemberg – 1998
- Doctor honoris causa, University of California – March 1998
- Doctor honoris causa, Technical University of Munich – March 1998
- Scopus Award, Hebrew University of Jerusalem – May 1998
- Austrian Cross of Honour for Science and Art, 1st class – August 1999

== Death ==
Maucher died at the age of 90 in his home in Bad Homburg, Germany on 5 March 2018.

== Bibliography ==
- La stratégie Nestlé, French translation by Monique Thiollet, Maxima Ed., Paris, 1995, ISBN 2840010720
