= Benefit tourism =

Migrating to benefit from welfare spending

Benefit tourism is a political term coined in the 1990s and later used for the perceived threat that a huge number of citizens from eight of the ten new nations given membership in the European Union in the 2004 enlargement of the European Union would move to the existing member states to benefit from their social welfare systems rather than to work. This threat was in several countries used as a reason for creating temporary work or benefit restrictions for citizens from the eight new member states.

== Criticism ==
Claims of benefit tourism by EU citizens have been described as unfounded and misleading by research organisations. A major study by the Centre for Research and Migration at University College London, published in 2009, demonstrated that EU migrants to Britain from the new member countries were better educated, more likely to be in employment and much less likely to be claiming benefits than UK-born nationals.

Scare stories of benefits tourism propagated by some media in the UK have been described as 'baseless' by the Migrants' Rights Network, which in March 2011 pointed out that EU migrants must meet the usual Habitual Residence Tests in order to register for British National Insurance (without a National Insurance number you can't receive any benefits), and are in fact moving to other areas of the EU where employment opportunities are better.

In 2013 the European Commission ordered an EU wide study on the impact of mobile EU citizens on national social security systems. This study confirmed that the vast majority of EU migrants move to find or take up employment. No evidence was found that the main motivation of EU citizens to migrate was benefit-related. On average immigrants received less benefits than nationals of the Member State where they are residing.

Another study conducted in 2014 concentrated on the UK specifically. This study showed that from 2001 to 2011, EU migrants that recently arrived in the UK had paid £20 billion in taxes to the UK treasury, after deduction of the benefits they received in that same period.

== See also ==
- Economic results of migration
