= WGZ Bank =

Coordinates: 51.2196°N 6.7976°E

The WGZ Bank (officially WGZ BANK AG Westdeutsche Genossenschafts-Zentralbank) was the umbrella organization of some 230 cooperative financial institutions in the Rhineland and in Westphalia.

Based in Düsseldorf, the company offers long-term real estate loans, services for the international currency financing business with member banks, and investment analysis and asset management services for private clients, as well as custodian for a number of funds in Luxembourg. As a wholesale bank, it acts as a trading partner in currency, foreign exchange, and capital markets, as well as in bond issuing and syndications.

From 2011 WGZ Bank and DZ Bank merged their private banking businesses based in Luxembourg to further strengthen their operations in Germany.

In 2016, WGZ Bank was merged into DZ Bank, the central institute of co-operative banks in all other parts of Germany.

== See also ==
- List of banks in Germany
