= 2014 European Union bank stress test =

The European Union-wide banking stress test 2014 was conducted by the European Banking Authority in order to assess the resilience of financial institutions in the European Union to a hypothetical adverse market scenario. In total, 123 major EU banks participated in the exercise. 24 banks failed the test with an overall capital shortfall of EUR 24.2 billion under the adverse scenario.

== Background ==
The European Banking Authority (EBA) aims to ensure the proper functioning of financial markets and the stability of the financial system in the EU. To this end, the EBA has the right to conduct the EU-wide stress tests, in cooperation with the European Systemic Risk Board (ESRB). Such exercises are designed to test the resilience of financial institutions to adverse market developments.

The stress tests are performed in cooperation with the ESRB, the European Central Bank (ECB), national competent authorities and the European Commission. In particular, the EBA was responsible for the common methodology and disclosure of the results. The ESRB and the European Commission designed the underlying macroeconomic scenarios. The quality assurance process of banks’ results was led by the ECB and national competent authorities. Moreover, the ECB conducted the "Asset Quality Review" that served as a starting point of the stress test.

In 2014, the ECB performed the Comprehensive Assessment in parallel before taking over its supervisory role under the new policy of European Banking Supervision on November 4, 2014. The results of the stress test were an integral part of the Comprehensive Assessment.

== Features of the stress test ==
Banks needed to assess the impact of a macroeconomic baseline and adverse scenario. The scenarios each covered a period of three years (2014–2016). The baseline scenario is based on the macroeconomic growth forecast of the European Commission whereas the adverse scenario describes a hypothetical worldwide recession.

Risk types considered in the stress test included credit risk, market risk, sovereign risk, securitization and cost of funding. Both trading and banking book assets will be subject to stress, including off-balance sheet exposures.

The stress test relied on a static balance sheet assumption implying no new growth and a constant business mix and model over the whole time horizon.

Whether a bank passed the stress test was determined according to the resulting Common Equity Tier 1 (CET1) ratio under the baseline and adverse scenario. The definition of CET1 of the CRR/CRD IV (i.e. the implementation of Basel III in the EU) was applied. In order to pass the stress test, banks needed to clear the CET1 hurdle rates of 8% in the baseline scenario and 5.5% in the adverse scenario.

== Results of the stress test ==
On average, the common equity tier 1 (CET1) ratio of the participating banks dropped by 260 basis points in the adverse scenario, from 11.1% at the end of 2013 after adjustments due to the Asset Quality Review (AQR) to 8.5% at the end of 2016. 24 banks fell below the hurdle rate of 5.5% with an overall capital of 24.2 billion EUR. The main drivers for this impact are credit risk losses and an increase in risk weighted assets. Out of the 24 banks that failed, 9 were from Italy and three from Greece and Cyprus each. Since some banks had raised or converted capital between the starting point of the exercise and the publication date, 13 out of 24 banks remained with a capital shortfall after consideration of these capital measures (remaining shortfall of 9.5 billion EUR).

In addition, 16 banks did not clear the hurdle rate of 8% in the baseline scenario after adjustments due to the AQR, with an aggregate shortfall of 9.4 billion EUR.
