= 2009 Supervisory Capital Assessment Program =

Test on U.S. banks

The Supervisory Capital Assessment Program, publicly described as the bank stress tests (even though a number of the companies that were subject to them were not banks), was an assessment of capital conducted by the Federal Reserve System and thrift supervisors to determine if the largest U.S. financial organizations had sufficient capital buffers to withstand the recession and the financial market turmoil. The test used two macroeconomic scenarios, one based on baseline conditions and the other with more pessimistic expectations, to plot a 'What If?' exploration into the banking situation in the rest of 2009 and into 2010. The capital levels at 19 institutions were assessed based on their Tier 1 common capital, although it was originally thought that regulators would use tangible common equity as the yardstick. The results of the tests were released on May 7, 2009, at 5pm EST.

Before the tests were completed, the central problems facing the Treasury Department were (1) whether the tests would increase or decrease confidence in any companies that did badly on their tests and (2) whether or not the $350 billion in bailout funds that remained could cover the needed funding after the tests.

== Scope and purpose ==
The exercise was limited to bank holding companies (national banks and companies which own banks) with assets greater than $100 billion. The 19 banking organizations included in the exercise comprised the core of the US banking system, representing roughly two-thirds of aggregate U.S. bank holding company assets.

The supervisors conducted the capital assessments on an interagency basis to ensure that they were carried out in a timely and consistent manner. Each participating financial institution was instructed to analyze potential firm-wide losses, including in its loan and securities portfolios, as well as from any off-balance sheet commitments and contingent liabilities/exposures, under two defined economic scenarios over a two-year time horizon (2009 – 2010). In addition, firms with trading assets of $50 billion or more were asked to estimate potential trading-related losses under the same scenarios.

Participating financial institutions also forecasted internal resources available to absorb losses, including pre-provision net revenue and the allowance for loan losses. As part of the supervisory process, the supervisors met with senior management at each financial institution to review and discuss the institution's loss and revenue forecasts. Based on those discussions, the supervisors assessed institution-specific potential losses and estimated resources to absorb those losses under the baseline and more adverse case, and determined whether the institution had a sufficient capital buffer necessary to ensure it had the amount and quality of capital necessary to perform its vital role in the economy.

== Macroeconomic scenarios and assumptions ==
The capital assessment covered two economic scenarios: a baseline scenario and a more adverse scenario.

=== Baseline scenario ===
For implementation of the supervisory capital assessment program, the baseline assumptions for real GDP growth and the unemployment rate for 2009 and 2010 were assumed to be equal to the average of the projections published by Consensus Forecasts, the Blue Chip Economic Indicators survey, and the Survey of Professional Forecasters in February 2009. This baseline was intended to represent a consensus view about the depth and duration of the recession. Given the current uncertain environment, there is a risk that the economy could turn out to be appreciably weaker than expected in the baseline outlook.

The assumptions for the baseline economic outlook are consistent with the house price path implied by futures prices for the Case-Shiller 10-City Composite index and the average response to a special question on house prices in the latest Blue Chip survey.

=== More adverse scenario ===
To aid financial institutions in their ongoing risk management practices, the supervisors have also put together an alternative “more adverse” scenario. By design, the path of the US economy in this alternative more adverse scenario reflects a deeper and longer recession than in the baseline. The consensus expectation is that economic activity is likely to be better than shown in the more adverse alternative; nonetheless, an outcome such as the alternative cannot be ruled out. The “more adverse” scenario was constructed from the historical track record of private forecasters as well as their current assessments of uncertainty. In particular, based on the historical accuracy of Blue Chip forecasts made since the late 1970s, the likelihood that the average unemployment rate in 2010 could be at least as high as in the alternative more adverse scenario is roughly 10 percent. In addition, the subjective probability assessments provided by participants in the January Consensus Forecasts survey and the February Survey of Professional Forecasters imply a roughly 15 percent chance that real GDP growth could be as least as low, and unemployment at least as high, as assumed in the more adverse scenario.

For the more adverse scenario, house prices are assumed to be about 10 percent lower at the end of 2010 relative to their level in the baseline scenario. Based on the year-to-year variability in house prices since 1900, and controlling for macroeconomic factors, there is roughly a 10 percent probability that house prices will be 10 percent lower than in the baseline by 2010.

=== Scenario macroeconomic variables ===
	2009	2010
Real GDP (percent change in annual average)		
Average Baseline (as released in February 2009)	-2.0	2.1
Consensus Forecasts	-2.1	2.0
Blue Chip	-1.9	-2.0
Survey of Professional Forecasters
2.2
Alternative More Adverse	-3.3	0.5
Civilian unemployment rate (annual average)		
Average Baseline (released in February 2009)	8.4	8.8
Consensus Forecasts	8.4	9.0
Blue Chip	8.3	8.7
Survey of Professional Forecasters	8.4	8.8
Alternative More Adverse	8.9	10.3
House Prices (Case-Shiller 10-City Composite, percent change, fourth quarter of the previous year to fourth quarter of the year indicated)		
Baseline	-14	-4
Alternative More Adverse	-22	-7

== Results and consequences ==
The capital assessment is intended to capture all aspects of a financial institution's business that would be impacted under the baseline and more adverse scenarios.

Supervisors will carefully evaluate the forecasts submitted by each financial institution to ensure they are appropriate, consistent with the firm's underlying portfolio performance and reflective of each entity's particular business activities and risk profile. The assessment of the firm's capital and the size of any potential needed additions to capital will be determined by the supervisors.

The assessment of capital adequacy considers many factors including: the inherent risks of the institution's exposures and business activities, the quality of its balance sheet assets and its off-balance-sheet commitments, the firm's earning projections, expectations regarding economic conditions and the composition and quality of its capital.

Specific factors supervisors consider include: uncertainty about the potential impact on earnings and capital from current and prospective economic conditions; asset quality and concentrations of credit exposures; the potential for unanticipated losses and declines in asset values; off-balance sheet and contingent liabilities (e.g., implicit and explicit liquidity and credit commitments); the composition, level and quality of capital; the ability of the institution to raise additional common stock and other forms of capital in the market; and other risks that are not fully captured in regulatory capital calculations.

Under current rules for bank holding companies, supervisors expect bank holding companies to hold capital above minimum regulatory capital levels, commensurate with the level and nature of the risks to which they are exposed. That amount of capital held in excess of minimum capital requirements should be commensurate with their firm-specific risk profiles, and account for all material risks. The assessment of capital under the two macroeconomic scenarios being used in the capital assessment program will permit supervisors to ascertain whether the buffer over the regulatory capital minimum is appropriate under more severe but plausible scenarios.

An institution that requires additional capital will enter into a commitment to issue a CAP convertible preferred security to the U.S. Treasury in an amount sufficient to meet the capital requirement determined through the supervisory assessment. Each institution will be permitted up to six months to raise private capital in public markets to meet this requirement and would be able to cancel the capital commitment without penalty. The CAP convertible preferred securities will be converted into common equity shares on an as-needed basis. Financial institutions that issued preferred capital under Treasury's existing Capital Purchase Program (TARP 1) will have the option of redeeming those securities and replacing them with the new CAP convertible preferred securities.

The capital assessment is part of the supervisory process and thus subject to the same framework used for bank examinations or bank holding company inspections. There will be ample opportunity for discussions between the financial institutions and supervisory agencies regarding the loss estimates and earnings forecasts during the capital assessment process.

== Banks tested ==
The nineteen bank holding companies being stress-tested are as follows:

Asset ranking	Bank	Result: additional capital needed, or adequate
1	Bank of America	$33.9 billion
2	JPMorgan Chase	adequate
3	Citigroup	$5.5 billion
4	Wells Fargo	$13.7 billion
5	Goldman Sachs	adequate
6	Morgan Stanley	$1.8 billion
7	Metropolitan Life Insurance Company	adequate
8	PNC Financial Services	$0.6 billion
9	U.S. Bancorp	adequate
10	The Bank of New York Mellon	adequate
11	GMAC	$11.5 billion
12	SunTrust Banks	$2.2 billion
13	Capital One	adequate
14	BB&T	adequate
15	Regions Financial Corporation	$2.5 billion
16	State Street Corporation	adequate
17	American Express	adequate
18	Fifth Third Bank	$1.1 billion
19	KeyCorp	$1.8 billion

The capital needs found by the test are based on the adverse scenario for the recession. All of these bank holding companies currently exceed the legally mandated capital requirements. However, the government will try by extra-legal means to compel those who are found to need more to obtain it.

== See also ==
- List of bank stress tests for a list of bank stress tests by year and region, including non U.S.
- Note: there was no 2010 stress test of banks conducted in the USA and the follow on bank stress tests were called a Comprehensive Capital Assessment Review (CCAR)
