= Stress test (financial) =

Simulation of a financial asset or institution under crisis conditions

In finance, a stress test is an analysis or simulation designed to determine the ability of a given financial instrument or financial institution to deal with an economic crisis. Instead of doing financial projection on a "best estimate" basis, a company or its regulators may do stress testing where they look at how robust a financial instrument is in certain crashes, a form of scenario analysis. They may test the instrument under, for example, the following stresses:

- What happens if unemployment rate rises to v% in a specific year?
- What happens if equity markets crash by more than w% this year?
- What happens if GDP falls by x% in a given year?
- What happens if interest rates go up by at least y%?
- What if half the instruments in the portfolio terminate their contracts in the fifth year?
- What happens if oil prices rise by z%?
- What happens if there is a polar vortex event in a particular region?

This type of analysis has become increasingly widespread, and has been taken up by various governmental bodies (such as the PRA in the UK or inter-governmental bodies such as the European Banking Authority (EBA) and the International Monetary Fund) as a regulatory requirement on certain financial institutions to ensure adequate capital allocation levels to cover potential losses incurred during extreme, but plausible, events. The EBA's regulatory stress tests have been referred to as "a walk in the park" by Saxo Bank's Chief Economist. This emphasis on adequate, risk adjusted determination of capital has been further enhanced by modifications to banking regulations such as Basel II. Stress testing models typically allow not only the testing of individual stressors, but also combinations of different events. There is also usually the ability to test the current exposure to a known historical scenario (such as the Russian debt default in 1998 or 9/11 attacks) to ensure the liquidity of the institution. In 2014, 25 banks failed in a stress test conducted by EBA.

== Bank stress test ==
A bank stress test is a simulation based on an examination of the balance sheet of that institution. Large international banks began using internal stress tests in the early 1990s. In 1996, Basel I was amended to require banks and investment firms to conduct stress tests to determine their ability to respond to market events. However, up until 2007, stress tests were typically performed only by the banks themselves, for internal self-assessment.

Beginning in 2007, governmental regulatory bodies became interested in conducting their own stress tests to insure the effective operation of financial institutions. Since then, stress tests have been routinely performed by financial regulators in different countries or regions, to ensure that the banks under their authority are engaging in practices likely to avoid negative outcomes. In India, legislation was enacted in 2007 requiring banks to undergo regular stress tests. In October 2012, U.S. regulators unveiled new rules expanding this practice by requiring the largest American banks to undergo stress tests twice per year, once internally and once conducted by the regulators. Starting in 2014 midsized firms (i.e., those with $10–50 billion in assets) are also being required to conduct Dodd-Frank Act Stress Testing. In 2012, federal regulators also began recommending portfolio stress testing as a sound risk management practice for community banks or institutions that were too small to fall under Dodd-Frank's requirements. The Office of the Comptroller of the Currency (OCC) in an October 18, 2012, Bulletin recommends stress testing as a means to identify and quantify loan portfolio risk. The FDIC made similar recommendations for community banks.

Since the Federal Reserve began conducting Dodd–Frank Act Stress Tests, post-stress capital levels across large banking institutions have generally increased. The Federal Reserve has also continued to expand its expectations over time by introducing more sophisticated and challenging stress-testing scenarios.

The Federal Reserve conducts its supervisory stress test annually using at least two scenarios and publishes bank-level results. The test estimates losses, revenues, expenses, and resulting capital levels under hypothetical economic conditions to assess whether large banks can absorb losses while continuing to lend. The Board uses the results in part to set each covered firm's stress capital buffer requirement.

Statistician and risk analyst Nassim Taleb has advocated a different approach to stress testing saying that stress tests based on arbitrary numbers can be gamed. A more effective test is to assess the fragility of a bank by applying one stress test and scaling it up, which provides an indicator of how sensitive a bank is to changes in economic conditions.

== Payment and settlement systems stress test ==
Another form of financial stress testing is the stress testing of financial market infrastructure. As part of Central Banks' market infrastructure oversight functions, stress tests have been applied to payment and securities settlement systems. Since ultimately, the Banks need to meet their obligations in Central Bank money held in payment systems that are commonly operated or closely supervised by central banks (e.g. CHAPS, FedWire, Target2, which are also referred to as large value payment systems), it is of great interest to monitor these systems' participants' (mainly banks) liquidity positions.

The amount of liquidity held by banks on their accounts can be a lot less (and usually is) than the total value of transferred payments during a day. The total amount of liquidity needed by banks to settle a given set of payments is dependent on the balancedness of the circulation of money from account to account (reciprocity of payments), the timing of payments and the netting procedures used. The inability of some participants to send payments can cause severe falls in settlement ratios of payments. The failure of one participant to send payments can have negative contagion effects on other participants' liquidity positions and their potential to send payments.

By using stress tests it is possible to evaluate the short term effects of events such as bank failures or technical communication breakdowns that lead to the inability of chosen participants to send payments. These effects can be viewed as direct effects on the participant, but also as systemic contagion effects. How hard the other participants will be hit by a chosen failure scenario will be dependent on the available collateral and initial liquidity of participants, and their potential to bring in more liquidity. Stress test conducted on payment systems help to evaluate the short term adequacy and sufficiency of the prevailing liquidity levels and buffers of banks, and the contingency measures of the studied payment systems.

A financial stress test is only as good as the scenarios on which it is based. Those designing stress tests must literally imagine possible futures that the financial system might face. As an exercise of the imagination, the stress test is limited by the imaginative capacities of those designing the stress test scenarios. Sometimes, the stress test's designers fail to imagine plausible future scenarios, possibly because of professional peer pressure or groupthink within a profession or trade or because some things are just too horrible to imagine. For example, there was a failure by the great majority of financial experts to predict the 2008 financial crisis. The successive financial stress tests conducted by the European Banking Authority and the Committee of European Banking Supervisors in 2009, 2010 and 2011 illustrate this dynamic. The 2009 and 2010 stress tests assumed even in their adverse scenarios a relatively benign macro-economic environment of -0.6% economic growth in the Euro area; by 2011 it was clear that such assumptions were no longer just plausible, they were almost certain to happen; the adverse scenario had to be adjusted to a -4.0% growth scenario. Those reviewing and using the results of stress tests must cast a critical eye on the scenarios used in the stress test.

== See also ==
- CAMELS rating system § Sensitivity – sensitivity to market risk, especially interest rate risk
- Financial risk management § Banking
- List of bank stress tests
- Scenario analysis
- Simulation
- List of systemically important banks
