= Index of topics related to life extension =

Following is a list of topics related to life extension:

== A ==
- ACE inhibitor
- Actuarial escape velocity
- Adenosine triphosphate (ATP)
- Advanced Cell Technology Corporation
- Aerobic exercise
- Age-adjusted life expectancy
- Age-Related Eye Disease Study
- Age-Related Macular Degeneration
- Aging
- Aging and memory
- Aging-associated diseases
- Aging brain
- Aging population
- Alcor Life Extension Foundation
- Alternative medicine
- Altos Labs
- American Aging Association
- American Academy of Anti-Aging Medicine (A4M)
- Amyloid
- Amyloid plaque
- Amyotrophic lateral sclerosis (ALS), e.g., Lou Gehrig's disease
- Antagonistic Pleiotropy
- Antioxidant
  - Polyphenol antioxidant
- Antisense therapy
- Apoptosis
- Atherosclerosis
- ATP (adenosine triphosphate)
- Autoimmune disease

== B ==
- Biodemography
- Biodemography of human longevity
- Bioethics
- Biological clock
- Biogerontology
- Biological immortality
- Biomarkers of aging
- Biotechnology
- Brain–computer interface

== C ==
- Caloric restriction mimetic
- Caloric restriction
- CR Society International
- Cell replacement therapy
- Cholinergic
- Clone
- Cloning
  - Human cloning
  - Therapeutic cloning
- Club of Rome
- Cockayne's syndrome
- Cognitive enhancement
- Compensation law of mortality
- Complementary and alternative medicine
- Cross-link
- Cyborg
- Cynthia Kenyon
- Cryobiology
- Cryonics
- Cryopreservation
- Cryoprotectant

== D ==
- Daily values
- de Grey, Dr. Aubrey
  - De Grey Technology Review controversy
- Demopoulos M.D., Harry B.
- Dendrite
- DHT (dihydrotestosterone)
- Dietary supplement
- Dietary Supplement Health and Education Act of 1994
- Dihydrotestosterone (DHT)
- DNA (Deoxyribonucleic acid)
  - Mitochondrial DNA
- DNA damage theory of aging
- DNA repair
- Dog Aging Project
- Dolly the sheep
- Dopaminergic
- Drexler, K. Eric

== E ==
- Ending Aging, a 2007 book which describes Aubrey de Grey's biomedical proposal for defeating aging (i.e. SENS).
- Endocrine system
- Engineered negligible senescence
- Engines of creation
- Error catastrophe
- Eugenics
- Eugeroic
- Evolution of ageing
- Exercise
  - Aerobic exercise
- Existential risk
- Extropy

== F ==
- Fantastic Voyage: Live Long Enough to Live Forever
- Food and Drug Administration (FDA)
- Free radical
  - Superoxide radical
  - Hydroxyl radical
- Free-radical theory of aging
- Full Genome Sequencing
- Futures studies
- Futurology

== G ==
- Gene therapy
  - Pharmacological Gene Therapy
- Genetic code
- Genetic engineering
- Genetically modified organism
- Genetics of aging
- Genomics
- Geriatrics
- Geron Corporation
- Gerontology
- Geroprotector
- Gobel, David
- Gompertz-Makeham law of mortality
- Grossman, Terry
- Growth hormone (GH)

== H ==
- Harman, Denham
- Hayflick, Leonard
- Hayflick limit
- Health
- Health effects
- Healthy diet
- Healthy eating
- Heart Disease
- HeLa
- Hormesis
- Hormone replacement therapy
- Human cloning
- Human enhancement
- Human genetic engineering
- Human Genome Project
- Humanism
- Hypoxia

== I ==
- Induced pluripotent stem cell
- Immortal DNA strand hypothesis
- Immortality
- Immortalist Society
- Indefinite lifespan
- Institute for Ethics and Emerging Technologies

== K ==
- Kaeberlein, Matt
- Kent, Saul
- Kenyon, Cynthia
- Kirkwood, Thomas
- Klotho gene
- Kübler-Ross model
- Kurzweil, Ray

== L ==
- Lacks, Henrietta
- Life expectancy
- Life extension
- Life Extension: A Practical Scientific Approach
- Life Extension Advocacy Foundation
- Life Extension Foundation
- Life Extension Institute
- Limits to Growth
- Lipofuscin
- List of aging processes
- List of long-living organisms
- List of health and fitness magazines
- Longevity
- Longevity genes

== M ==
- Malthusian Catastrophe
- Malthusian Growth Model
- Malthusianism
- Malthus, Thomas
- Maximum life span
- Medawar, Peter
- Megadose
- Megadosing
- Megavitamin therapy
- Methuselah Foundation
- Methuselah Mouse Prize
- Mind transfer: mind uploading to a computer or to another biological body
- Mitohormesis
- Molecular engineering
- Molecular nanotechnology
- Monoamine oxidase (MAO)
- Morphological freedom
- Mortality rate

== N ==
- Nanomedicine
- Nanotechnology
- National Institute on Aging
- Neurite
- Neurochemical
- Neurodegenerative disease
- Neuroendocrine theory of aging
- Neurofibrillary tangle
- Neurotrophic factor
- Neurovitrification
- Nootropic
- Norepinephrin (noradrenaline)
- NSAID
- Nutrient
- Nutrition
- Nutritional supplement

== O ==
- Old age
- Organ transplant
- Orthomolecular medicine
- Overpopulation
- Oxidation (redox)
- Oxidative stress

== P ==
- Paleolithic diet
- Parkinson's disease
- Patients' Bill of Rights
- Pauling, Linus
- Pearl, Raymond
- Pearson, Durk
- Pharmacological Gene Therapy
- Polyphenol antioxidant
- Pollution
- Population control
- Population growth
- Population momentum
- Posthuman
- Predictive medicine
- Pregnenolone
- Prescription drugs (prices in the US prices)
- Prevention Magazine
- Prevention
- Preventive medicine
- Printable organs
- Pro-aging trance
- Procreative beneficence
- Progeria
- Progeroid syndromes
- Programmed cell death
  - Apoptosis (Type I cell death)
  - Autophagy (a.k.a. cytoplasmic, or Type II cell death))
- Programmed obsolescence
  - Prostatitis
- Pro-oxidant

== Q ==
- Quercetin

== R ==
- Rath, Matthias
- Raw foodism
- Reactive oxygen species
- Reliability theory
- Reliability theory of aging
- Redox (oxidation)
- Reference Daily Intake
- Regeneration
- Regenerative medicine
- Rejuvenation
- Reliability theory of aging and longevity
- Reprogenetics
- Resveratrol
- Ristow, Michael
- RNA

== S ==
- Safety
  - Occupational safety and health
- SAGE KE
- Senescence
- Senility
- Senolytic
- SENS Foundation
- Shaw, Sandy
- Sierra Sciences
- Sinclair, David
- Sleep deprivation
- Sports medicine
- Stem cell
- Stem cell treatments
- Stone, Irwin
- Strategies for engineered negligible senescence
- Superoxide dismutase (SOD)
- Superoxide

== T ==
- Technological determinism
- Technological evolution
- Technological singularity
- Technology assessment
- Techno-progressivism
- Techno-utopianism
- Telomere
- Therapeutic cloning
- Theories of aging
  - Antagonistic pleiotropy theory of aging
  - Disposable soma theory of aging
  - DNA damage theory of aging
  - Free-radical theory
  - Glycation theory of aging
  - Inflammation theory of aging
  - Neuroendocrine theory of aging
  - Order to disorder theory of aging
  - Rate of living theory
  - Reliability theory of aging and longevity
  - Somatic mutation theory of aging
- Thiel, Peter
- Timeline of senescence research
- Tissue engineering
- Transhumanism

== U ==
- Unageing
- Uniform Determination of Death Act
- United States Senate Agriculture Subcommittee on Research, Nutrition, and General Legislation

== V ==
- Vascular disease
- Vitamin
- Vitrification

== W ==
- Walford M.D., Dr. Roy Lee
- Weismann, August
- Werner syndrome
- West, Dr. Michael D.
- Williams, George C.

== X ==
- Xeroderma pigmentosum
