= Negligible senescence =

Organisms that do not exhibit evidence of biological aging

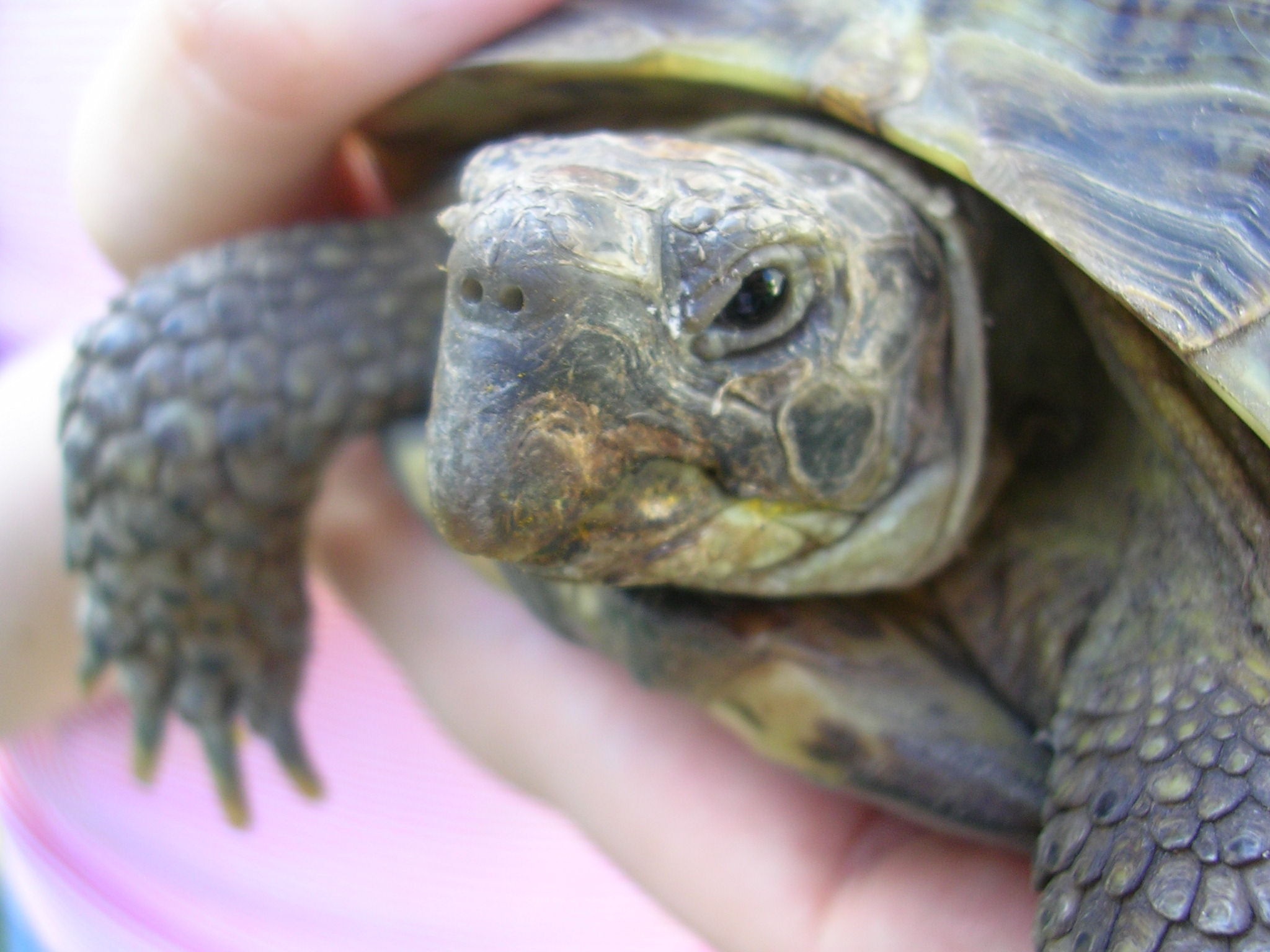
Some tortoises show negligible senescence.

Negligible senescence is a term coined by biogerontologist Caleb Finch to denote organisms that do not exhibit evidence of biological aging (senescence), such as measurable reductions in their reproductive capability, measurable functional decline, or rising death rates with age. There are many species where scientists have seen no increase in mortality after maturity. This may mean that the lifespan of the organism is so long that researchers' subjects have not yet lived up to the time when a measure of the species' longevity can be made. Turtles, for example, were once thought to lack senescence, but more extensive observations have found evidence of decreasing fitness with age.

Study of negligibly senescent animals may provide clues that lead to better understanding of the aging process and influence theories of aging. The phenomenon of negligible senescence in some animals is a traditional argument for attempting to achieve similar negligible senescence in humans by technological means.

== In vertebrates ==
Some fish, such as some varieties of sturgeon and rougheye rockfish, and some tortoises and turtles are thought to be negligibly senescent, although recent research on turtles has uncovered evidence of senescence in the wild. The age of a captured fish specimen can be measured by examining growth patterns similar to tree rings on the otoliths (parts of motion-sensing organs).

In 2018, naked mole-rats were identified as the first mammal to defy the Gompertz–Makeham law of mortality, and achieve negligible senescence. It has been speculated, however, that this may be simply a "time-stretching" effect primarily due to their very slow (and cold-blooded and hypoxic) metabolism.

== In plants ==
In plants, aspen trees are one example of biological immortality. Each individual tree can live for 40–150 years above ground, but the root system of the clonal colony is long-lived. In some cases, this is for thousands of years, sending up new trunks as the older trunks die off above ground. One such colony in Utah, given the nickname of "Pando", is estimated to be 80,000 years old, making it possibly the oldest living colony of aspens.

The world's oldest known living non-clonal organism was the Methuselah tree of the species Pinus longaeva, the bristlecone pine, growing high in the White Mountains of Inyo County in eastern California, aged 4857–4858 years. This record was superseded in 2012 by another Great Basin bristlecone pine located in the same region as Methuselah, and was estimated to be 5,062 years old. The tree was sampled by Edmund Schulman and dated by Tom Harlan.

Ginkgo trees in China resist aging by extensive gene expression associated with adaptable defense mechanisms that collectively contribute to longevity.

== In bacteria ==
Among bacteria, individual organisms are vulnerable and can easily die, but on the level of the colony, bacteria can live indefinitely. The two daughter bacteria resulting from cell division of a parent bacterium can be regarded as unique individuals or as members of a biologically "immortal" colony. The two daughter cells can be regarded as "rejuvenated" copies of the parent cell because damaged macromolecules have been split between the two cells and diluted. See asexual reproduction.

Aging and death have been reported for the bacterium Escherichia coli, an organism that reproduces by morphologically symmetrical division. The two progeny cells produced when an E. coli cell divides each have one new pole created by the division and one retained older pole. It was shown that those cell lines that retain older poles over successive cell divisions undergo aging. The old pole cells can be regarded as an aging parent repeatedly reproducing rejuventated offspring. Aging in the old pole cell includes cummulatively slowed growth, less offspring biomass production and an increased probability of death. Thus although bacteria divide symmetrically, they do not appear to be immune to the effects of aging.

== Maximum life span ==
Some examples of maximum observed life span of animals thought to be negligibly senescent are:

| Rougheye rockfish | 205 years |
| Aldabra giant tortoise | 255 years |
| Lobsters | 100+ years (presumed) |
| Hydras | Observed to be biologically immortal |
| Planaria | Observed to be biologically immortal |
| Sea anemones | 60–80 years (generally) |
| Red sea urchin | 200 years |
| Freshwater pearl mussel | 210–250 years |
| Ocean quahog clam | 507 years |
| Greenland shark | 400 years |

== Cryptobiosis ==
Some rare organisms, such as tardigrades, usually have short lifespans, but are able to survive for thousands of years—and, perhaps, indefinitely—if they enter into the state of cryptobiosis, whereby their metabolism is reversibly suspended.

== Negative senescence ==
There are also organisms (certain algae, plants, corals, molluscs, sea urchins and lizards) that exhibit negative senescence, whereby mortality chronologically decreases as the organism ages, for all or part of the life cycle, in disagreement with the Gompertz–Makeham law of mortality (see also Late-life mortality deceleration). Furthermore, there are species that have been observed to regress to a larval state and regrow into adults multiple times, such as Turritopsis dohrnii.

== See also ==
- Biological immortality
- DNA damage theory of aging
- Indefinite lifespan
- Maximum lifespan
- Strategies for engineered negligible senescence
- Societal effects of negligible senescence
