= James Vaupel =

American demographer (1945–2022)

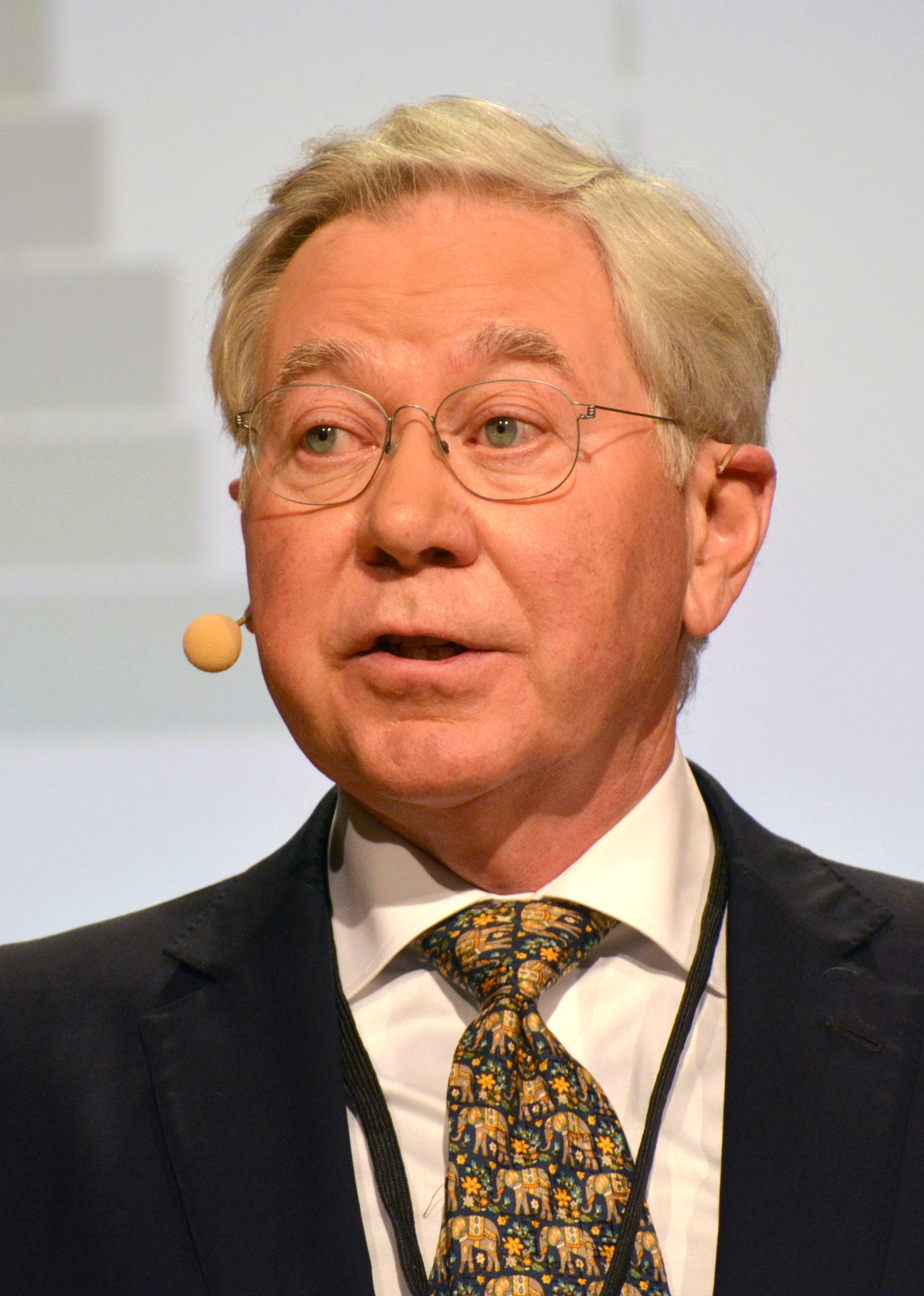
- Born: May 2, 1945; New York City, U.S.
- Died: March 27, 2022 (aged 76); Denmark
- Education: Harvard University
- Awards: Fellow of the American Academy of Arts and Sciences
- Scientific career
- Fields: Aging research, biodemography, demography
- Workplaces: Duke University; University of Minnesota; University of Southern Denmark; Max Planck Institute for Demographic Research
- Thesis: Early death: a policy analysis of the prospects for saving lives (1977)

James Walton Vaupel (May 2, 1945 – March 27, 2022) was an American demographer active in the fields of aging research and biodemography. He was instrumental in developing and advancing the idea of the plasticity of longevity, and pioneered research on the heterogeneity of mortality risks and on the deceleration of death rates at the highest ages.

== Later positions ==
Vaupel was the founding director of the Max Planck Institute for Demographic Research in Rostock, Germany in 1996. He was also a research professor at Duke University and the director of its Population, Policy, Aging and Research Center. Vaupel was a member of the German Academy of Sciences Leopoldina, a regular scientific member of the U.S. National Academy of Sciences and fellow of the American Academy of Arts and Sciences. He was involved in many endeavors and published over 20 books.

== Contributions ==
Convinced that formal demography is the source of the discipline's strength, Vaupel contributed to the methodological foundations of demography. In 2001 he was awarded by the Population Association of America the Irene B. Taeuber Award for his lifetime research achievements. In 2008 he received the Mindel C. Sheps Award for his work in mathematical demography.

Vaupel was a leading proponent of the idea of the plasticity of longevity. Many people believe there is a looming limit to human life expectancy. Vaupel's research shows that life expectancy is likely to increase well beyond the purported limit of 85 years. Furthermore, Vaupel and others (such as Bernard Jeune of Denmark) advanced a new proposition: that the human life span is not fixed, but is a function of life expectancy and population size. He and S. Jay Olshansky had a disagreement about what this means in terms of future projections of the human life span.

Vaupel's work also focused on the nascent field of evolutionary demography. His research activities here strived to understand age-specific mortality in terms of the evolutionary processes that shape it.

Because in his studies, particular attention is paid to mortality improvements at the end of the lifespan, Vaupel was instrumental in the emerging field of research into supercentenarians as a population subset. The number of persons aged 110+ in a single European nation is rather small. Vaupel therefore began the push in 2000 by inviting experts from around the world to meet in international workshops and to found the International Database on Longevity, which provides information on individuals attaining extreme ages and permits demographic analysis of mortality at the highest ages.

== Awards & recognitions ==
For his numerous publications and activities throughout his career, Vaupel received the following awards and recognitions:

- Recipient of the Irene B. Taeuber Award for Lifetime Achievement from the Population Association of America, USA (2001)
- European Latsis Prize (2011)
- Member of the German Academy of Natural Scientists Leopoldina, Germany (2008)
- Member of the American Academy of Arts and Sciences, USA (2008)
- Recipient of the Mindel C. Sheps Award for Mathematical Demography from the Population Association of America, USA (2008)
- Member of the National Academy of Sciences, USA (2004)
- Recipient of the Longevity Prize from the Ipsen Foundation, France (2003)
- Scientific Member of the Max Planck Society, Germany (since 1996)
- The Royal Order of Dannebrog (2022)
