= List of aging processes =

- Accumulation of lipofuscin
- Aging brain
- Calorie restriction
- Cross-link
- Crosslinking of DNA
- Degenerative disease
- DNA damage theory of aging
- Exposure to ultraviolet light
- Free-radical damage
- Glycation
- Life expectancy
- Longevity
- Maximum life span
- Senescence
- Stem cell theory of aging

== See also ==
- Index of topics related to life extension
