= Makeham =

Makeham is a surname. Notable people with the surname include:

- Bob Makeham (1901–1974), Australian rules footballer
- Eliot Makeham (1882–1956), English film and television actor
- William Makeham (1826–1891), English actuary and mathematician
