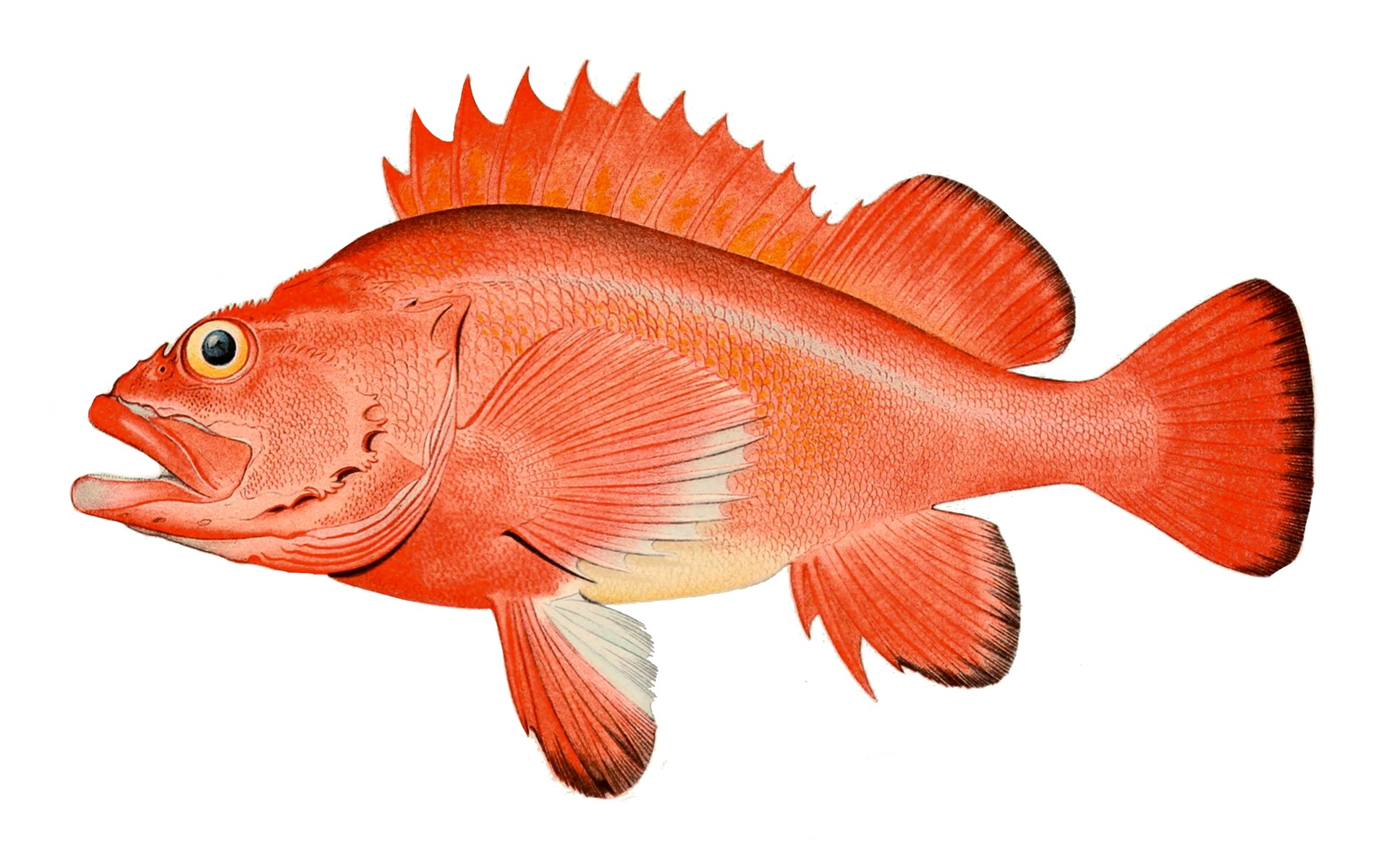
- Rougheye rockfish, one of the two species of Zalopyr

Scientific classification
- Kingdom: Animalia
- Phylum: Chordata
- Class: Actinopterygii
- Order: Perciformes
- Family: Scorpaenidae
- Genus: Sebastes
- Subgenus: Zalopyr

= Zalopyr =

Subgenus of fishes

Zalopyr is a subgenus of the genus Sebastes. The etymology derives from two Greek words: "zalos" meaning "surging" or "stormy," possibly referencing the turbulent habitat which it resides in. Pyr: meaning "fire," referring to the red color of S. aleutianus, one of its two species. Its other species is S. melanostictus. They are typically found below 300 meters and reaching depths of at least 500 meters.
