= William Makeham =

English actuary and mathematician

William Matthew Makeham (11 September 1826 – 17 November 1891) was an English actuary and mathematician.

Makeham was responsible for proposing the age-independent Makeham term in the Gompertz–Makeham law of mortality that, together with the exponentially age-dependent Gompertz term, was one of the most effective theories to describe human mortality.

Makeham was responsible for two important studies on human mortality:

- Makeham (1860). "On the Law of Mortality and the Construction of Annuity Tables". The Assurance Magazine, and Journal of the Institute of Actuaries. 8 (6): 301–310. doi:10.1017/S204616580000126X.
- Makeham (1874). "On an Application of the Theory of the Composition of Decremental Forces". Journal of the Institute of Actuaries. 18: 317–322.

He had one wife, Hepzibah Reed, and seven children, William, Amy, Elizabeth, Thomas, Frederick, Emily, and George.
