= Biodemography of human longevity =

Field of research

Biodemography is a multidisciplinary approach, integrating biological knowledge (studies on human biology and animal models) with demographic research on human longevity and survival. Biodemographic studies are important for understanding the driving forces of the current longevity revolution (dramatic increase in human life expectancy), forecasting the future of human longevity, and identification of new strategies for further increase in healthy and productive life span.

== Theory ==
Biodemographic studies have found a remarkable similarity in survival dynamics between humans and laboratory animals. Specifically, three general biodemographic laws of survival are found:

1. Gompertz–Makeham law of mortality
2. Compensation law of mortality
3. Late-life mortality deceleration (now disputed)

The Gompertz–Makeham law states that death rate is a sum of an age-independent component (Makeham term) and an age-dependent component (Gompertz function), which increases exponentially with age.

The compensation law of mortality (late-life mortality convergence) states that the relative differences in death rates between different populations of the same biological species are decreasing with age, because the higher initial death rates are compensated by lower pace of their increase with age.

The disputed late-life mortality deceleration law states that death rates stop increasing exponentially at advanced ages and level off to the late-life mortality plateau. A consequence of this deceleration is that there would be no fixed upper limit to human longevity — no fixed number which separates possible and impossible values of lifespan. If true, this would challenges the common belief in existence of a fixed maximal human life span.

Biodemographic studies have found that even genetically identical laboratory animals kept in constant environment have very different lengths of life, suggesting a crucial role of chance and early-life developmental noise in longevity determination. This leads to new approaches in understanding causes of exceptional human longevity.

As for the future of human longevity, biodemographic studies found that evolution of human lifespan had two very distinct stages – the initial stage of mortality decline at younger ages is now replaced by a new trend of preferential improvement of the oldest-old survival. This phenomenon invalidates methods of longevity forecasting based on extrapolation of long-term historical trends.

A general explanation of these biodemographic laws of aging and longevity has been suggested based on system reliability theory.

== See also ==
- Stress Modeling
- Demography
- Biodemography
- Longevity
- Life extension
- List of life extension-related topics
- Reliability theory of aging and longevity
