= Compensation law of mortality =

Measurement of death rates in populations

The compensation law of mortality (or late-life mortality convergence) states that the relative differences in death rates between different populations of the same biological species decrease with age, because the higher initial death rates in disadvantaged populations are compensated by lower pace of mortality increase with age. The age at which this imaginary (extrapolated) convergence of mortality trajectories takes place is named the "species-specific life span" (see Gavrilov and Gavrilova, 1979). For human beings, this human species-specific life span is close to 95 years (Gavrilov and Gavrilova, 1979; 1991).

Compensation law of mortality is a paradoxical empirical observation, and it represents a challenge for methods of survival analysis based on proportionality assumption (proportional hazard models). The compensation law of mortality also represents a great challenge for many theories of aging and mortality, which usually fail to explain this phenomenon. On the other hand, the compensation law follows directly from reliability theory, when the compared systems have different initial levels of redundancy.

== See also ==
- Ageing
- Biodemography of human longevity
- Biogerontology
- Demography
- Mortality
- Reliability theory of aging and longevity
