= Mortality rate =

Deaths per 1,000 individuals per year

Mortality rate of countries, deaths per thousand

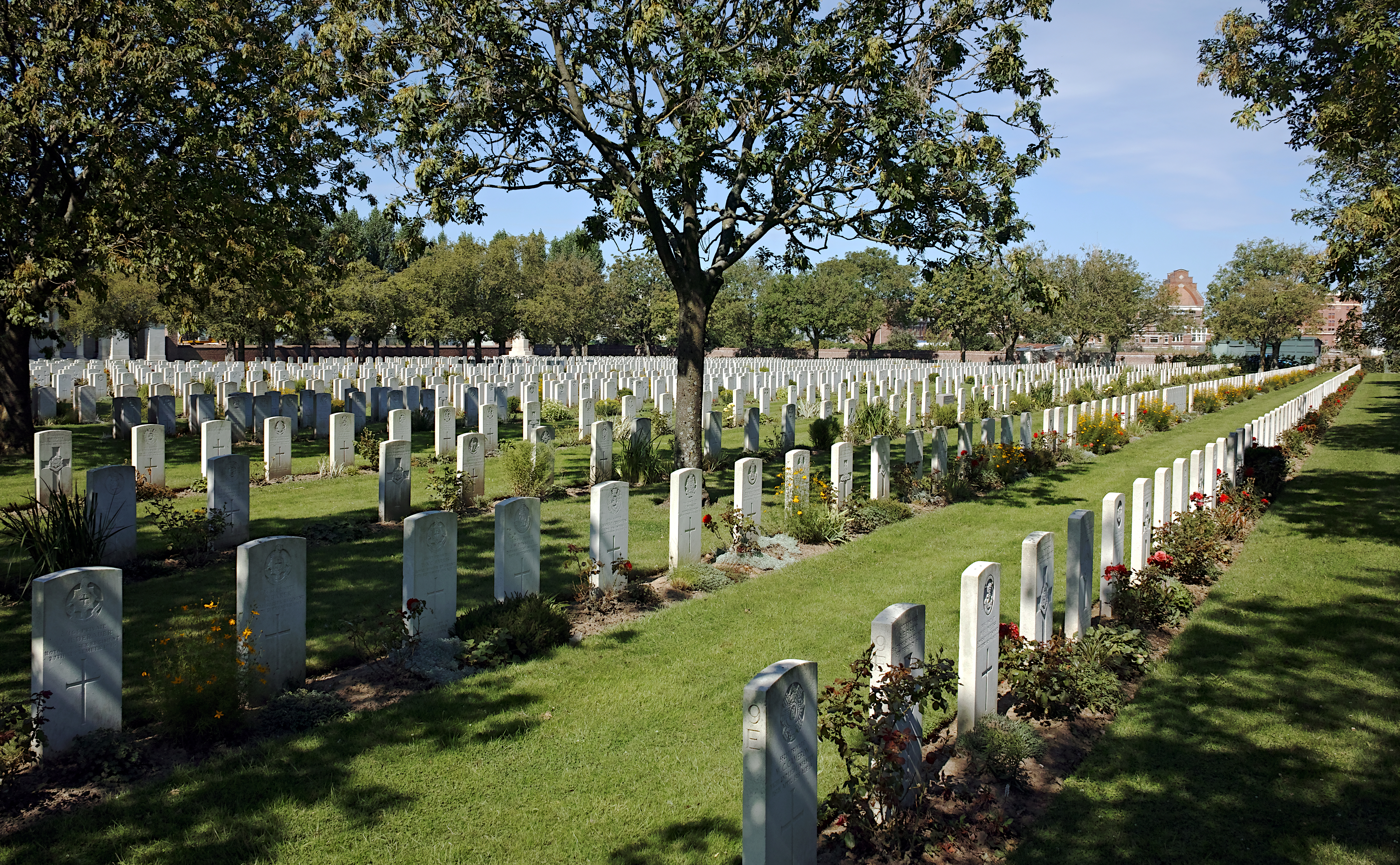
Tobacco kills more than 7 million people every year. Tobacco use is the leading fully preventable cause of death globally.

Mortality rate, or death rate, is a measure of the number of deaths (in general, or due to a specific cause) in a particular population, scaled to the size of that population, per unit of time. Mortality rate is typically expressed in units of deaths per 1,000 individuals per year; thus, a mortality rate of 9.5 (out of 1,000) in a population of 1,000 would mean 9.5 deaths per year in that entire population, or 0.95% out of the total. It is distinct from "morbidity", which is either the prevalence or incidence of a disease, and also from the incidence rate (the number of newly appearing cases of the disease per unit of time).

An important specific mortality rate measure is the crude death rate, which looks at mortality from all causes in a given time interval for a given population. As of 2020, for instance, the CIA estimates that the crude death rate globally will be 7.7 deaths per 1,000 people in a population per year. As of 2024, the global crude death rate stood at 7.76, marking a 2.35% rise compared to 2023. In a generic form, mortality rates can be seen as calculated using $(d/p) \cdot 10^n$, where d represents the deaths from whatever cause of interest is specified that occur within a given time period, p represents the size of the population in which the deaths occur (however this population is defined or limited), and $10^n$ is the conversion factor from the resulting fraction to another unit (e.g., multiplying by $10^3$ to get mortality rate per 1,000 individuals).

== Crude death rate, globally ==
The crude death rate is defined as "the mortality rate from all causes of death for a population," calculated as the "total number of deaths during a given time interval" divided by the "mid-interval population", per 1,000 or 100,000; for instance, the population of the United States was around 290,810,000 in 2003, and in that year, approximately 2,419,900 deaths occurred in total, giving a crude death (mortality) rate of 832 deaths per 100,000. As of 2020, the CIA estimates the U.S. crude death rate will be 8.3 per 1,000, while it estimates that the global rate will be 7.7 per 1,000.

According to the World Health Organization, the ten leading causes of death, globally, in 2016, for both sexes and all ages, were as presented in the table below.

Crude death rate, per 100,000 population

1. Ischaemic heart disease, 126
2. Stroke, 77
3. Chronic obstructive pulmonary disease, 41
4. Lower respiratory infections, 40
5. Alzheimer's disease and other dementias, 27
6. Trachea, bronchus, and lung cancers, 23
7. Diabetes mellitus, 21
8. Road injury, 19
9. Diarrhoeal diseases, 19
10. Tuberculosis, 17

Mortality rate is also measured per thousand. It is determined by how many people of a certain age die per thousand people. Decrease of mortality rate is one of the reasons for increase of population. Development of medical science and other technologies has resulted in the decrease of mortality rate in all the countries of the world for some decades. In 1990, the mortality rate of children under five years of age was 144 per thousand, but in 2015 the child mortality rate was 38 per thousand.

== Related measures of mortality ==
Other specific measures of mortality include:

Measures of mortality
Name	Typical definition
Perinatal mortality rate	The sum of fetal deaths (stillbirths) past 22 (or 28) completed weeks of pregnancy plus the number of deaths among live-born children up to 7 completed days of life, divided by number of births.
Maternal mortality rate	Number of deaths of mothers assigned to pregnancy-related causes during a given time interval, divided by the number of live births during the same time interval.
Infant mortality rate	Number of deaths among children <one year of age during a given time interval divided by the number of live births during the same time interval.
Child mortality rate (also known as 'Under-five mortality rate')	Number of deaths of children less than 5 years old, divided by number of live births.
Standardized mortality ratio (SMR)	The ratio of the number of deaths in a given (index) population to the number of deaths expected, a form of indirectly (as opposed to directly) standardized rates, where the categories are usually "defined by age, gender and race or ethnicity". The numerator is calculated as $\sum n_iR_i$, where "$n_i$ is the number of persons in category $i$ of the index population and $R_i$ is the corresponding category-specific event rate in a standard population." It has also been described as a proportional comparison to the numbers of deaths that would have been expected if the population had been of a standard composition in terms of age, gender, etc.
Age-specific mortality rate (ASMR)	The total number of deaths per year at a specific age, divided by the number of living persons at that age (e.g. age 62 at last birthday)
Cause-specific death rate	Number of deaths assigned to a specific cause during a given time interval divided by the mid-interval population
Cumulative death rate	The incidence proportion of death, that is, the proportion of a [defined] group that dies over a specified time interval, whether in reference to all deaths over the time inverval, or "to deaths from a specific cause or causes". It has also been described as a measure of the (growing) proportion of a group that die over a specified period (often as estimated by techniques that account for missing data by statistical censoring).
Case fatality rate (CFR)	The proportion of diagnosed cases of a particular medical condition that lead to death.
Infection fatality rate (IFR)	The proportion of infected cases of a particular medical condition that lead to death. Similar to CFR, but adjusted for asymptomatic and undiagnosed cases.

For any of these, a "sex-specific mortality rate" refers to "a mortality rate among either males or females", where the calculation involves both "numerator and denominator... limited to the one sex".

== Use in epidemiology ==
In most cases there are few if any ways to obtain exact mortality rates, so epidemiologists use estimation to predict correct mortality rates. Mortality rates are usually difficult to predict due to language barriers, health infrastructure related issues, conflict, and other reasons. Maternal mortality has additional challenges, especially as they pertain to stillbirths, abortions, and multiple births. In some countries, during the 1920s, a stillbirth was defined as "a birth of at least twenty weeks' gestation in which the child shows no evidence of life after complete birth". In most countries, however, a stillbirth was defined as "the birth of a fetus, after 28 weeks of pregnancy, in which pulmonary respiration does not occur".

=== Census data and vital statistics ===
Ideally, all mortality estimation would be done using vital statistics and census data. Census data will give detailed information about the population at risk of death. The vital statistics provide information about live births and deaths in the population. Often, either census data and vital statistics data is not available. This is common in developing countries, countries that are in conflict, areas where natural disasters have caused mass displacement, and other areas where there is a humanitarian crisis

=== Household surveys ===
Household surveys or interviews are another way in which mortality rates are often assessed. There are several methods to estimate mortality in different segments of the population. One such example is the sisterhood method, which involves researchers estimating maternal mortality by contacting women in populations of interest and asking whether or not they have a sister, if the sister is of child-bearing age (usually 15) and conducting an interview or written questions about possible deaths among sisters. The sisterhood method, however, does not work in cases where sisters may have died before the sister being interviewed was born.

Orphanhood surveys estimate mortality by questioning children are asked about the mortality of their parents. It has often been criticized as an adult mortality rate that is biased for several reasons. The adoption effect is one such instance in which orphans often do not realize that they are adopted. Additionally, interviewers may not realize that an adoptive or foster parent is not the child's biological parent. There is also the issue of parents being reported on by multiple children while some adults have no children, thus are not counted in mortality estimates.

Widowhood surveys estimate adult mortality by responding to questions about the deceased husband or wife. One limitation of the widowhood survey surrounds the issues of divorce, where people may be more likely to report that they are widowed in places where there is the great social stigma around being a divorcee. Another limitation is that multiple marriages introduce biased estimates, so individuals are often asked about first marriage. Biases will be significant if there is an association of death between spouses, such as those in countries with large STD or STI epidemics, like AIDS.

=== Sampling ===
Sampling refers to the selection of a subset of the population of interest to efficiently gain information about the entire population. Samples should be representative of the population of interest. Cluster sampling is an approach to non-probability sampling; this is an approach in which each member of the population is assigned to a group (cluster), and then clusters are randomly selected, and all members of selected clusters are included in the sample. Often combined with stratification techniques (in which case it is called multistage sampling), cluster sampling is the approach most often used by epidemiologists. In areas of forced migration, there is more significant sampling error. Thus cluster sampling is not the ideal choice.

== Mortality statistics ==
Causes of death vary greatly between developed and less developed countries; see also list of causes of death by rate for worldwide statistics.

World historical and predicted crude death rates (1950–2050) UN, medium variant, 2012 rev.
Years	CDR	Years	CDR
1950–1955	19.1	2000–2005	8.4
1955–1960	17.3	2005–2010	8.1
1960–1965	16.2	2010–2015	8.1
1965–1970	12.9	2015–2020	8.1
1970–1975	11.6	2020–2025	8.1
1975–1980	10.6	2025–2030	8.3
1980–1985	10.0	2030–2035	8.6
1985–1990	9.4	2035–2040	9.0
1990–1995	9.1	2040–2045	9.4
1995–2000	8.8	2045–2050	9.7

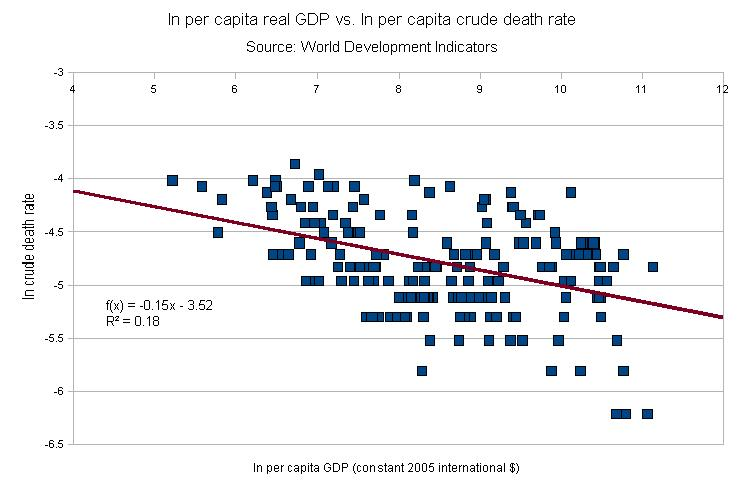
Scatter plot of the natural logarithm (ln) of the crude death rate against the natural log of per capita GDP. The slope of the trend line is the elasticity of the crude death rate with respect to per capita income. It indicates that as of the date of the basis data set, an increase in per capita income tends to be associated with a decrease in the crude death rate. Source: World Development Indicators.

According to Jean Ziegler (the United Nations Special Rapporteur on the Right to Food for 2000 to March 2008), mortality due to malnutrition accounted for 58% of the total mortality in 2006: "In the world, approximately 62 million people, all causes of death combined, die each year. In 2006, more than 36 million died of hunger or diseases due to deficiencies in micronutrients".

Of the roughly 150,000 people who die each day across the globe, about two thirds—100,000 per day—die of age-related causes. In industrialized nations, the proportion is much higher, reaching 90%.

== Economics ==
Scholars have stated that there is a significant relationship between a low standard of living that results from low income; and increased mortality rates. A low standard of living is more likely to result in malnutrition, which can make people more susceptible to disease and more likely to die from these diseases. A lower standard of living may lead to as a lack of hygiene and sanitation, increased exposure to and the spread of disease, and a lack of access to proper medical care and facilities. Poor health can in turn contribute to low and reduced incomes, which can create a loop known as the health-poverty trap. Indian economist and philosopher Amartya Sen has stated that mortality rates can serve as an indicator of economic success and failure.

Historically, mortality rates have been adversely affected by short term price increases. Studies have shown that mortality rates increase at a rate concurrent with increases in food prices. These effects have a greater impact on vulnerable, lower-income populations than they do on populations with a higher standard of living.

In more recent times, higher mortality rates have been less tied to socio-economic levels within a given society, but have differed more between low and high-income countries. It is now found that national income, which is directly tied to standard of living within a country, is the largest factor in mortality rates being higher in low-income countries.

=== Preventable mortality ===
These rates are especially pronounced for children under 5 years old, particularly in lower-income, developing countries. These children have a much greater chance of dying of diseases that have become mostly preventable in higher-income parts of the world. More children die of malaria, respiratory infections, diarrhea, perinatal conditions, and measles in developing nations. Data shows that after the age of 5 these preventable causes level out between high and low-income countries.

== See also ==
- Biodemography
- Compensation law of mortality
- Demography
- Gompertz–Makeham law of mortality
- Life table
- List of causes of death by rate
- List of countries by birth rate
- List of countries by death rate
- List of countries by life expectancy
- Maximum life span
- Medical statistics
- Micromort
- Mortality displacement
- Risk adjusted mortality rate
- Vital statistics
- Weekend effect
- World population
