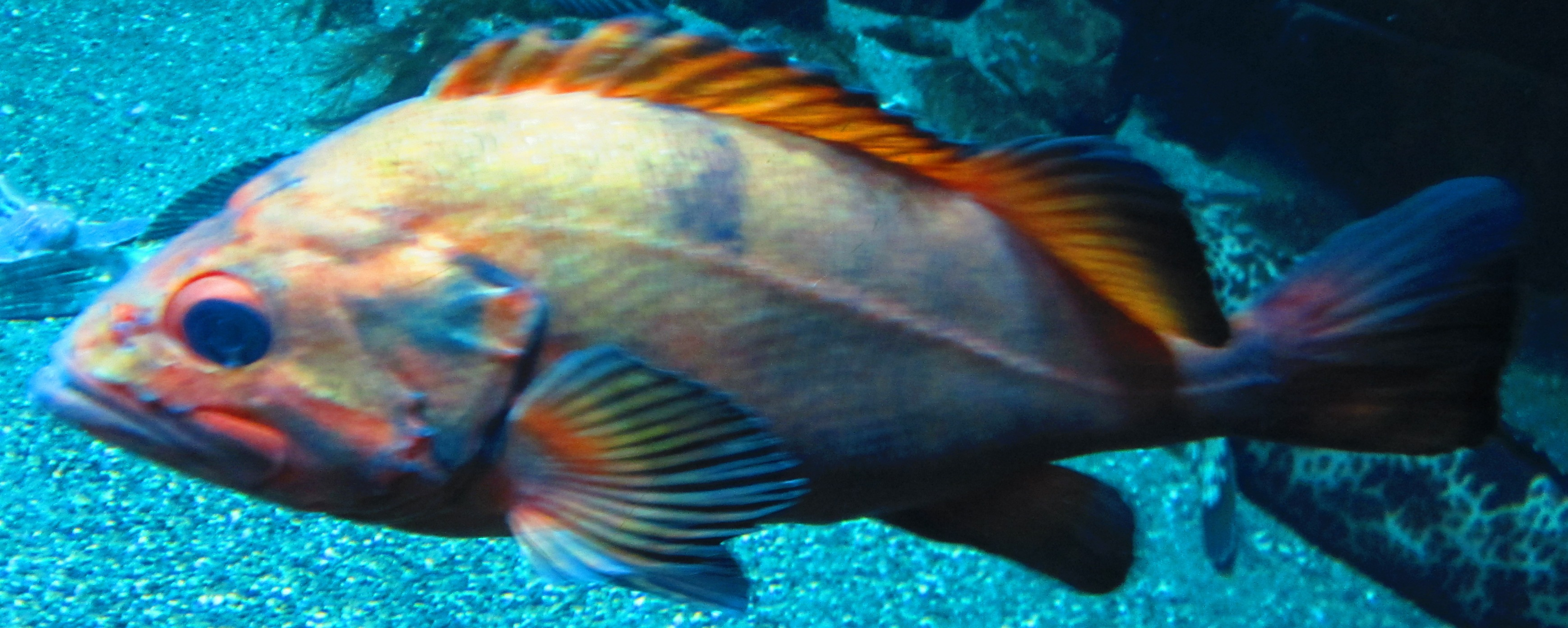
- At the Alaska SeaLife Center, Seward, Alaska.

Scientific classification
- Kingdom: Animalia
- Phylum: Chordata
- Class: Actinopterygii
- Division: Teleostei
- Order: Perciformes
- Family: Scorpaenidae
- Genus: Sebastes
- Species: S. melanostictus

Binomial name
- Sebastes melanostictus (Matsubara, 1934)

Synonyms
- Sebastodes melanostictus Matsubara, 1934; Sebastodes kawaradae Matsubara, 1934; Sebastes kawaradae (Matsubara, 1934)

= Sebastes melanostictus =

Species of fish

Sebastes melanostictus, the blackspotted rockfish, is a species of marine ray-finned fish belonging to the subfamily Sebastinae, the rockfishes, part of the family Scorpaenidae. It is found in the northern Pacific Ocean.

== Taxonomy ==
Sebastes melanostictus was first formally described in 1934 as Sebastodes melanostictus by the Japanese ichthyologist Kiyomatsu Matsubara with the type locality given as Kazusa Province in Japan. This taxon has been considered to be a synonym of the rougheye rockfish (S. aleutianus) but is now accepted as a valid species and both it and the rougheye rockfish are classified within the subgenus Zalopyr. The specific name, melanostictus, means "black spotted".

== Description ==
Sebastes melanostictus is similar to the rougheye rockfish and both these species have eight pairs of spines on the head plus at least two infraorbital spines. The dorsal fin has 12-14 spines and 12-15 soft rays while the anal fin has 3 spines and 7 or 8 soft rays. This species is usually darker in colour than the rougheye rockfish and is farther distinguished by the presence of dark spots on the spiny part of the dorsal fin, although this is sometimes obscured by dark blotches. The overall colour of the body is pink to red marked with dark spots. Some specimens may be darker with a black or greenish tint to the overall colour with dense mottling and spots on the lateral line, there is a rare dusky morph which shows little mottling. There are sometimes three white spots along the base of the dorsal fin. This species attains a maximum total length of 53.9 cm (21.2 in).

== Distribution and habitat ==
Sebastes melostictus is found from Japan around the northern Pacific through the Kuril Islands, Aleutian Islands, and north into the Bering Sea, as far north as 60.5°, then south along the western coast of North America south to the Coronado Bank off southern California. It is a benthopelagic species found at depths between 84 and 1,000 m (276 and 3,281 ft), although it is typically found between 350 and 450 m (1,150 and 1,480 ft). They are found close to substrates of sediments where there are many boulders and the slope is greater than 20°.

== Biology ==
Sebastes melanostictus has been treated as synonymous with S. aleutianus, which has a little known biology anyway, and separate details of its biology are sparse. Like other rock fish it is predatory and crangid and pandalid shrimps are the most common prey items while larger individuals, i.e. those longer than 30 cm (12 in) eat a lot of fishes, other known prey are gammarid amphipods; mysids, crabs, polychaetes, and octopuses. The oldest recorded individual in this species pair was 205 years old and this specimen was taken in southern Alaska.

Half of the females in a stock of either species are sexually mature at 20 years old. Off British Columbia S. aleutianus/S. melanosticta breed in April and like their ovoviviparous congeners the fertilised eggs stay in the ovaries until the larvae are extruded and are given some nutrient by their mother, The larvae of Sebastes rockfishe occur near the surface where they are opportunistic feeders on invertebrate eggs, copepods and krill. As juveniles they are found in midwater preying on larger animals. The pelagic larvae of Sebastes rockfishes have been recorded as far as 500 km (310 mi) from the coast of British Columbia and there is no evidence to suggest that the larvae and juveniles of this species complex have a different life history and biology from those of most of the congeners.

It is thought that predators of the fishes include Pacific halibut (Hippoglossus stenolepis), Pacific cod (Gadus macrocephalus) and the sablefish (Amoplopoma fimbria).

== Fisheries ==
Sebastes melanostictus inhabiots deep water where fishing effort is low and there is not thought to be a targeted fishery for this species. However, catch surveys off Oregon and Washington are suggesting that this species is making up much of the rockfish catch as it lives at depths where fishing is less restricted by the existing fishing regulations.
