= Gompertz–Makeham law of mortality =

Mathematical equation related to human death rate

Gompertz–Makeham
- Parameters: $\alpha \in \mathbb{R}^+$ $\beta \in \mathbb{R}^+$ $\lambda \in \mathbb{R}^+$
- Support: $x \in \mathbb{R}^+$
- PDF: $\left( \alpha e^{\beta x} + \lambda \right) \cdot \exp \left[ -\lambda x-\frac{\alpha}{\beta} \left( e^{\beta x} -1\right) \right]$
- CDF: $1-\exp \left[-\lambda x-\frac{\alpha}{\beta} \left( e^{\beta x}-1\right) \right]$

Effect of alpha on Gompertz-Makeham density function

The Gompertz–Makeham law of mortality is a mathematical model for the age pattern of death rates. It expresses the force of mortality (instantaneous hazard of death) as the sum of two components: an age-dependent term, the Gompertz function, that increases approximately exponentially with age, and an approximately age-independent background term known as the Makeham term. In populations where deaths from external causes are rare, the background component is often small and mortality can be well described by the simpler Gompertz law of mortality.

For adult humans, the Gompertz component captures the empirical regularity that the individual risk of death rises steeply with age. After early adulthood, many populations are reasonably described by an almost exponential increase in hazard, with the probability of dying in a given year approximately doubling every eight years. The model is not intended to describe the elevated mortality of infancy and early childhood, and at the very highest ages estimates of the mortality trajectory are sensitive to data quality and modelling assumptions. Some demographic studies report a slowing of the increase in death rates or a plateau among the oldest-old, while others find that cleaned data remain compatible with Gompertz–Makeham-type behaviour over a wide age range.

Because of its simple functional form and interpretable parameters, the Gompertz–Makeham law is widely used in actuarial science for constructing life tables and pricing life insurance and pension products, in demography and gerontology for modelling adult mortality, and in reliability theory of ageing and longevity as a parametric survival distribution for biological and technical systems.

== History ==
In 1825 the English actuary Benjamin Gompertz published an analysis of human mortality in which he proposed that the age-specific force of mortality increases approximately exponentially with age. This "law of human mortality" was soon adopted in actuarial work on life table construction and annuity valuation, and later became known simply as the Gompertz law of mortality.

In 1860 the actuary William Makeham generalised Gompertz's formulation by adding an approximately age-independent term to represent deaths from external causes that affect all ages in a population. The resulting Gompertz–Makeham law expressed the force of mortality as the sum of an exponentially increasing intrinsic component and a constant background component, and it quickly became a standard model in actuarial science and demography.

During the twentieth century the Gompertz–Makeham model was revisited in the emerging fields of biodemography and the reliability theory of ageing and longevity, where it was used to describe regularities in adult human mortality and to compare patterns of ageing across species and populations.

== Mathematical formulation ==
In continuous-time form, the Gompertz–Makeham law specifies the hazard function (or force of mortality) at age $x$ as

$$\mu(x) = \alpha e^{\beta x} + \lambda, \qquad x \ge 0, \ \alpha > 0, \ \beta > 0, \ \lambda \ge 0.$$

The term $\alpha e^{\beta x}$ is the Gompertz component and increases approximately exponentially with age. The constant term $\lambda$ is the Makeham component and represents an approximately age-independent background risk of death from causes such as accidents and acute infections.

If the hazard has this form for all ages, then the associated survival function $S(x)$ and cumulative distribution function $F(x)$ define the Gompertz–Makeham distribution. They can be written as

$$S(x) = \exp\left(-\lambda x - \frac{\alpha}{\beta}\bigl(e^{\beta x}-1\bigr)\right), \qquad x \ge 0,$$
$$F(x) = 1 - S(x) = 1 - \exp\left(-\lambda x - \frac{\alpha}{\beta}\bigl(e^{\beta x}-1\bigr)\right),$$

and the corresponding probability density function $f(x)$ is

$$f(x) = \bigl(\alpha e^{\beta x} + \lambda\bigr)\,\exp\left(-\lambda x - \frac{\alpha}{\beta}\bigl(e^{\beta x}-1\bigr)\right), \qquad x > 0.$$

These relationships give a parametric model for adult lifetimes and other failure-time data.

The scale parameter $\alpha$ governs the initial level of the age-dependent mortality component, $\beta$ controls the exponential rate at which this component increases with age, and $\lambda$ represents the level of background mortality that does not depend strongly on age. Setting $\lambda = 0$ yields the Gompertz distribution and hence the classical Gompertz law of mortality, while taking $\alpha \to 0$ with $\lambda$ fixed gives an exponential distribution with constant hazard.

For some analytical and simulation tasks it is useful to work with the quantile function $Q(u)$, defined as the inverse of the cumulative distribution function. A closed-form expression for $Q(u)$ can be written using the principal branch $W_0$ of the Lambert W function as

$$Q(u) = \frac{\alpha}{\beta\lambda} - \frac{1}{\lambda}\ln(1-u) - \frac{1}{\beta} W_0\!\left(\frac{\alpha}{\lambda} \exp\!\left[\frac{\alpha}{\lambda}\right](1-u)^{-\beta/\lambda}\right), \qquad 0 < u < 1,$$

which provides a direct way to generate random lifetimes with Gompertz–Makeham distribution from a uniform random variable.

=== Moments and life expectancy ===
Let $X$ denote a non-negative random variable with Gompertz–Makeham hazard $\mu(x) = \alpha e^{\beta x} + \lambda$ and survival function $S(x)$ as above. The mean lifetime (life expectancy at birth) can be written as

$$\operatorname{E}[X] = \int_0^\infty S(x)\,\mathrm{d}x.$$

For the Gompertz–Makeham distribution this integral has a closed form in terms of the upper incomplete gamma function $\Gamma(s,z)$. One convenient expression is

$$\operatorname{E}[X] = \frac{e^{\alpha/\beta}}{\beta}\left(\frac{\alpha}{\beta}\right)^{\lambda/\beta} \Gamma\!\left(-\frac{\lambda}{\beta}, \frac{\alpha}{\beta}\right),$$

which applies for $\alpha > 0$, $\beta > 0$ and $\lambda \ge 0$. More general formulas for remaining life expectancy at an arbitrary age can be written in a similar way and are often used in demographic and actuarial applications.

Higher moments can be defined through the general identity

$$\operatorname{E}[X^k] = k \int_0^\infty x^{k-1} S(x)\,\mathrm{d}x, \qquad k > 0,$$

so that the variance of $X$ is

$$\operatorname{Var}(X) = 2 \int_0^\infty x S(x)\,\mathrm{d}x - \bigl(\operatorname{E}[X]\bigr)^2.$$

Closed-form expressions for these integrals in terms of special functions are available in the literature and are used to study how life expectancy and variability in age at death depend on the model parameters.

=== Rate of increase and mortality doubling time ===
The Gompertz component of the hazard, $\mu_{\text{G}}(x) = \alpha e^{\beta x}$, has a logarithm that is linear in age:

$$\log \mu_{\text{G}}(x) = \log \alpha + \beta x.$$

The constant slope $\beta$ describes how fast the log-hazard increases with age. A commonly used summary is the mortality doubling time, defined as the age interval $T$ for which the Gompertz component doubles,

$$\mu_{\text{G}}(x+T) = 2\,\mu_{\text{G}}(x).$$

Solving this equation gives

$$T = \frac{\ln 2}{\beta}.$$

When Gompertz–Makeham curves are fitted to adult human mortality, estimated values of $\beta$ are often around $0.085$ per year, which corresponds to a doubling time of about eight years and matches the empirical rule of thumb described in studies of adult mortality.

=== Discrete-time approximation and annual death probabilities ===
In life-table work, mortality is often described in terms of the one-year probability of death between ages $x$ and $x+1$, usually denoted $q_x$. For a continuous-time model with hazard $\mu(t)$, the corresponding one-year death probability can be written as

$$q_x = 1 - \exp\!\left(-\int_x^{x+1} \mu(t)\,\mathrm{d}t\right).$$

If $\mu(t) = \alpha e^{\beta t} + \lambda$ follows the Gompertz–Makeham form for all real $t \ge 0$, then straightforward integration gives

$$\int_x^{x+1} \mu(t)\,\mathrm{d}t = \lambda + \frac{\alpha}{\beta}\bigl(e^{\beta(x+1)} - e^{\beta x}\bigr),$$

and therefore

$$q_x = 1 - \exp\!\left(-\lambda - \frac{\alpha}{\beta}\bigl(e^{\beta(x+1)} - e^{\beta x}\bigr)\right).$$

In practice, actuaries often estimate Gompertz–Makeham parameters from such discrete probabilities and then use the continuous model to derive related quantities such as life expectancies and annuity values.

=== Alternative parametrisations ===
Several alternative parametrisations of the Gompertz–Makeham law are used in the literature. One simple reparameterisation is to take a reference age $x_0$ and define the background-free Gompertz hazard at that age,

$$h_0 = \mu_{\text{G}}(x_0) = \alpha e^{\beta x_0},$$

so that the full hazard can be written as

$$\mu(x) = \lambda + h_0 e^{\beta (x - x_0)}.$$

This form replaces the original parameter $\alpha$ with the more interpretable level $h_0$ at a specified age.

A second useful reparameterisation uses the mortality doubling time $T_d = \ln 2 / \beta$ in place of $\beta$. Writing

$$\mu(x) = \lambda + h_0\,2^{(x - x_0)/T_d}$$

makes it explicit how many years it takes for the Gompertz component of the hazard to double, which can be convenient when comparing mortality schedules between populations or over time.

=== Parameter estimation ===
Parameters of the Gompertz–Makeham model are typically estimated from observed lifetimes or grouped mortality data. For independent lifetimes $T_1,\ldots,T_n$ with right-censoring indicators $\delta_i$, the log-likelihood under a continuous-time hazard $\mu(x;\theta)$ and survival function $S(x;\theta)$ can be written in the standard form

$$\ell(\theta) = \sum_{i=1}^n \left[ \delta_i \log \mu\bigl(T_i;\theta\bigr) + \log S\bigl(T_i;\theta\bigr) \right].$$

Substituting the Gompertz–Makeham hazard

$$\mu(x;\theta) = \alpha e^{\beta x} + \lambda$$

and survival function

$$S(x;\theta) = \exp\left(-\lambda x - \frac{\alpha}{\beta}\bigl(e^{\beta x}-1\bigr)\right)$$

gives an explicit log-likelihood function in the three parameters $\alpha$, $\beta$ and $\lambda$. These parameters can then be estimated numerically by maximising the log-likelihood or by related methods, such as least squares fits to log-mortality rates or regression models for grouped death counts.

=== Illustrative example ===
Suppose lifetimes follow a Gompertz–Makeham law with hazard

$$\mu(x) = \alpha e^{\beta x} + \lambda$$

where

$$\alpha = 0.00003, \qquad \beta = 0.095, \qquad \lambda = 0.0004.$$

The cumulative hazard, and survival functions are

$$H(x) = \lambda x + \frac{\alpha}{\beta}\bigl(e^{\beta x} - 1\bigr),\qquad S(x) = \exp\bigl(-H(x)\bigr),$$

the cumulative distribution, and probability density functions are

$$F(x) = 1 - S(x),\qquad f(x) = \mu(x)\,S(x).$$

==== Survival to a given age ====
To find the probability that a newborn survives to age 60, compute the cumulative hazard at 60

$$H(60) = 0.0004\times 60 + \frac{0.00003}{0.095}\bigl(e^{0.095\times 60} - 1\bigr) \approx 0.024 + 0.094 = 0.118.$$

The survival probability at age 60 is then

$$S(60) = e^{-H(60)} \approx e^{-0.118} \approx 0.89.$$

Thus, in this example, the probability of being alive at 60 is $\Pr(X > 60) = S(60) \approx 0.89$, and the probability of having died before 60 is $F(60) = 1 - S(60) \approx 0.11.$

==== Probability between two ages ====
To find the probability that a newborn dies between ages 60 and 70, compute the survival at age 70 in the same way:

$$H(60) = 0.0004\times 70 + \frac{0.00003}{0.095}\bigl(e^{0.095\times 70} - 1\bigr) \approx 0.028 + 0.244 = 0.272.$$

The survival probability at age 70 is then

$$S(70) = e^{-H(70)} \approx e^{-0.272} \approx 0.76$$

and

$$F(70) = 1 - S(70) \approx 0.24.$$

The probability that death occurs between ages 60 and 70 is

$$\Pr(60 < X \le 70) = F(70) - F(60) \approx 0.24 - 0.11 = 0.13.$$

== Empirical patterns ==
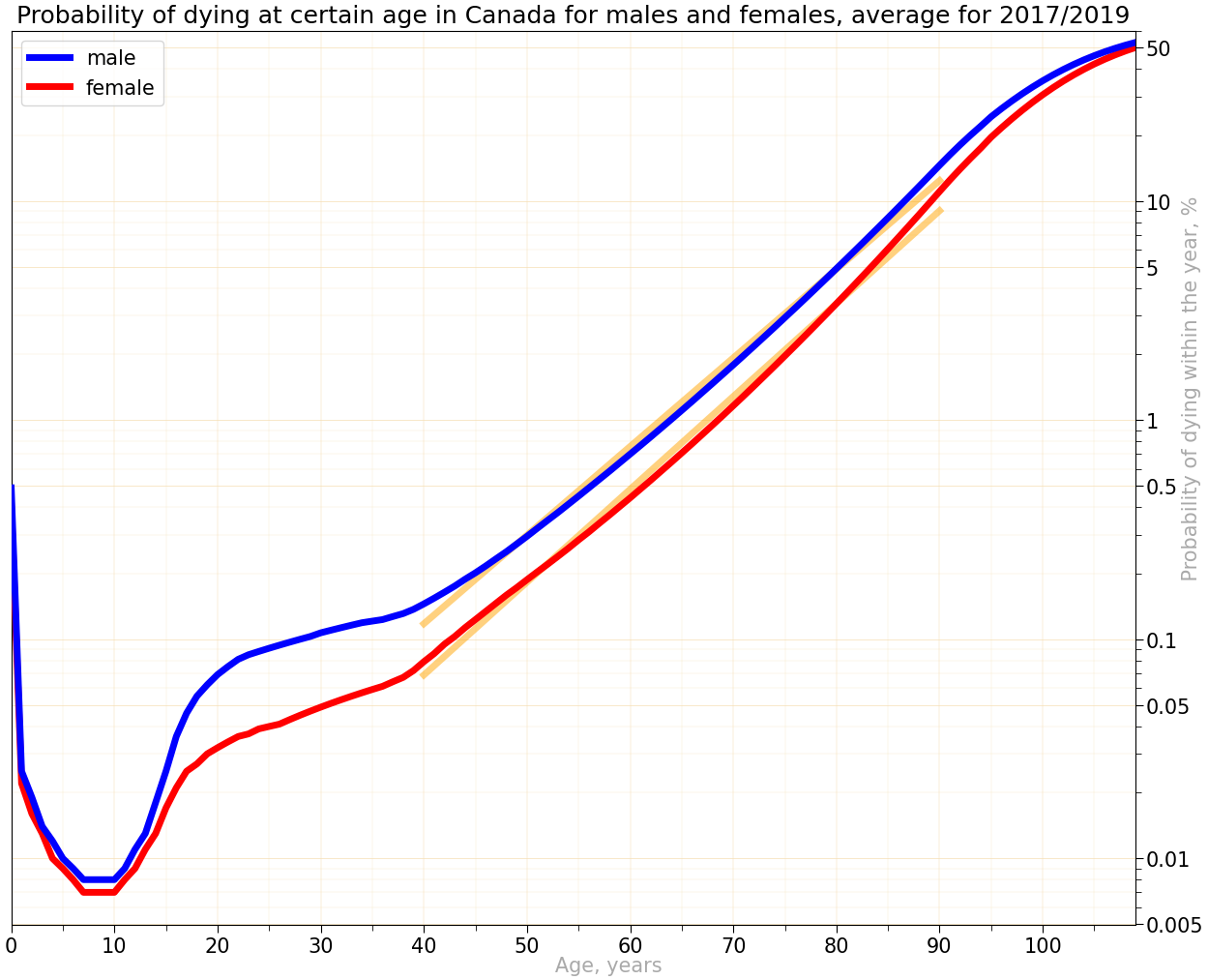
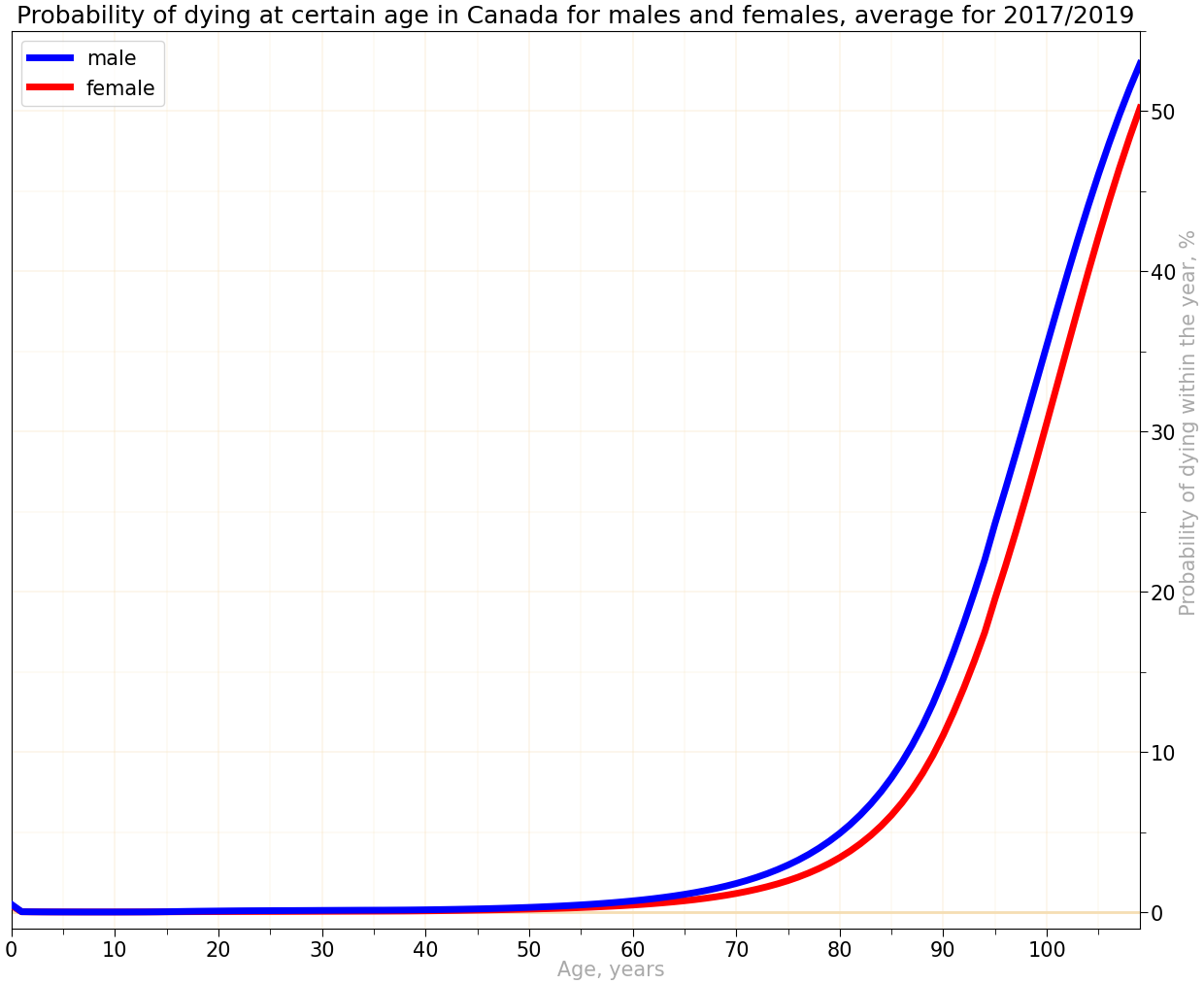
Probability of dying for male and female based on the life tables for Canada for 2017–2019 period. The chart is made in two versions: using a semilogarithmic scale with overlaid approximation by an exponential function and using a linear scale. The probability of dying between ages of 40 and 90 doubles every 7.4 years for male and 7.1 years for female. By the age of 109, the probability of dying reaches 53% for male and 50% for female.
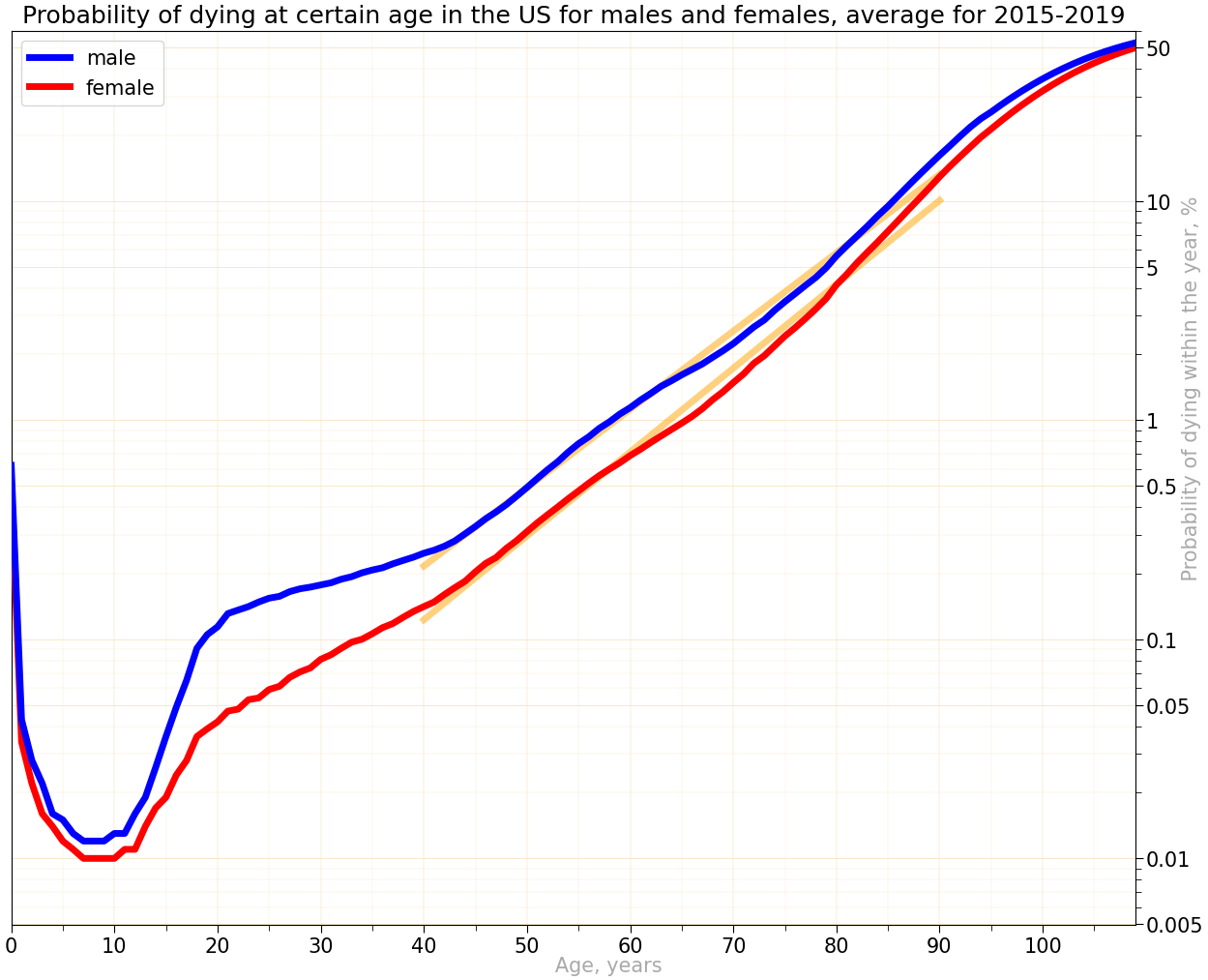
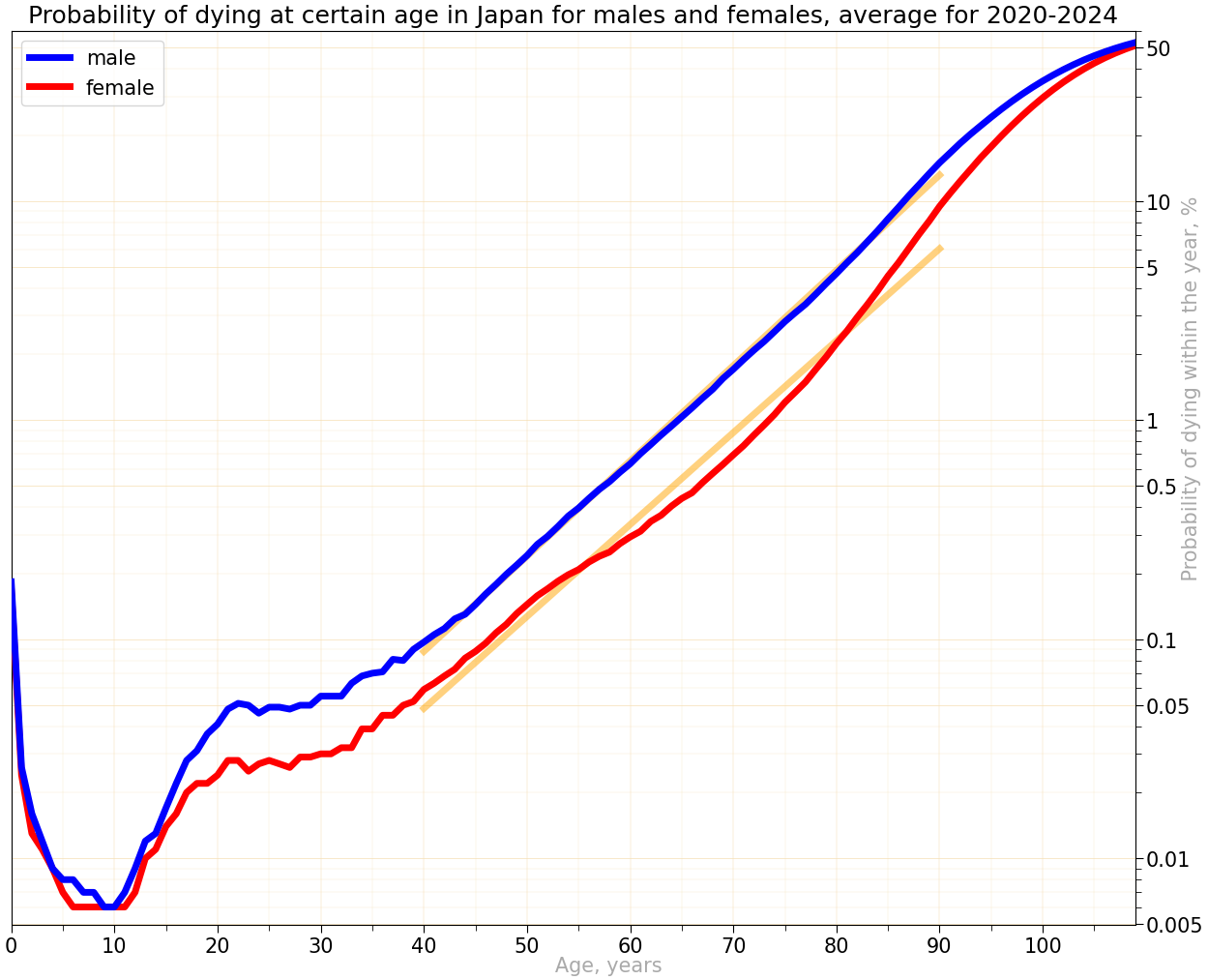
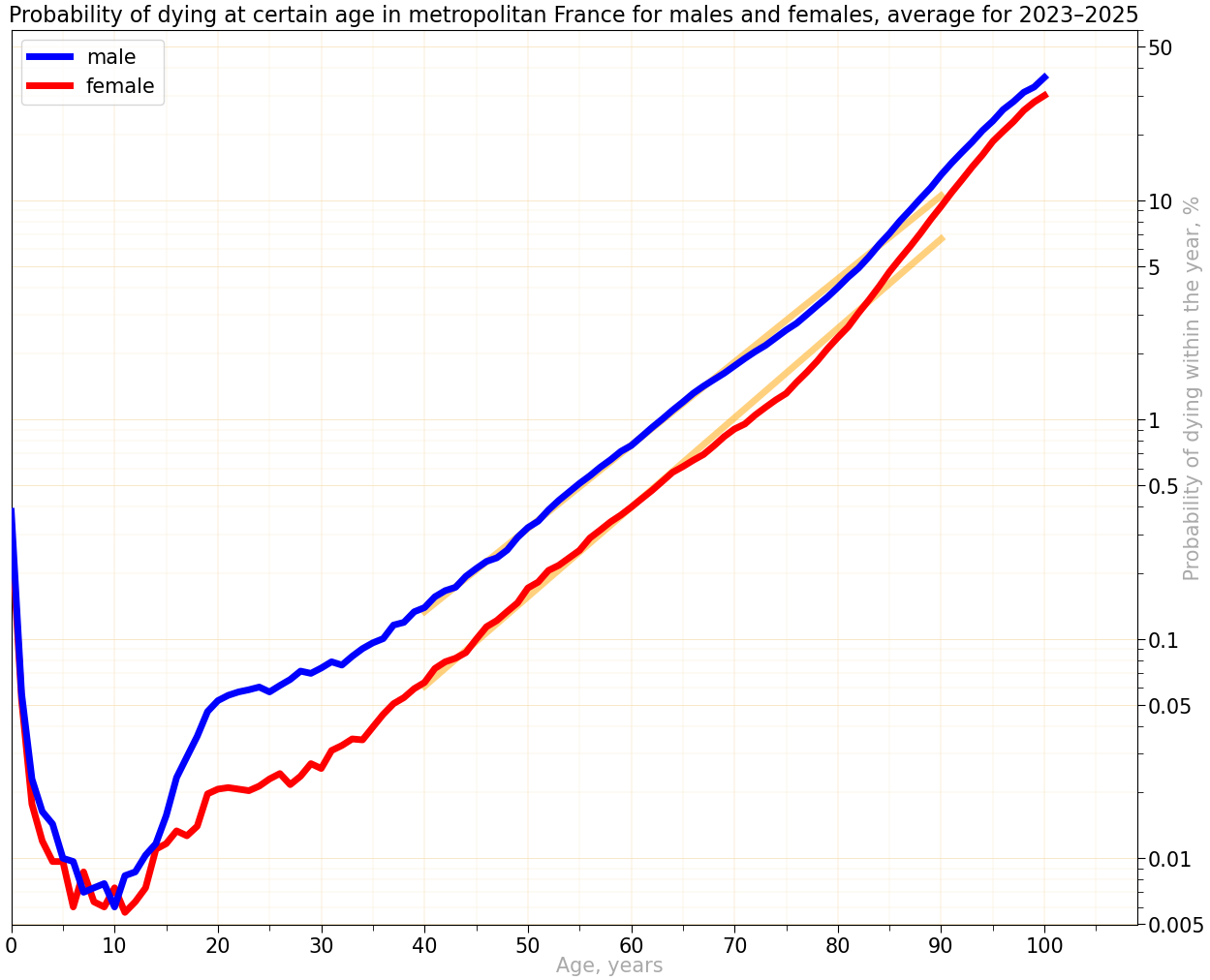
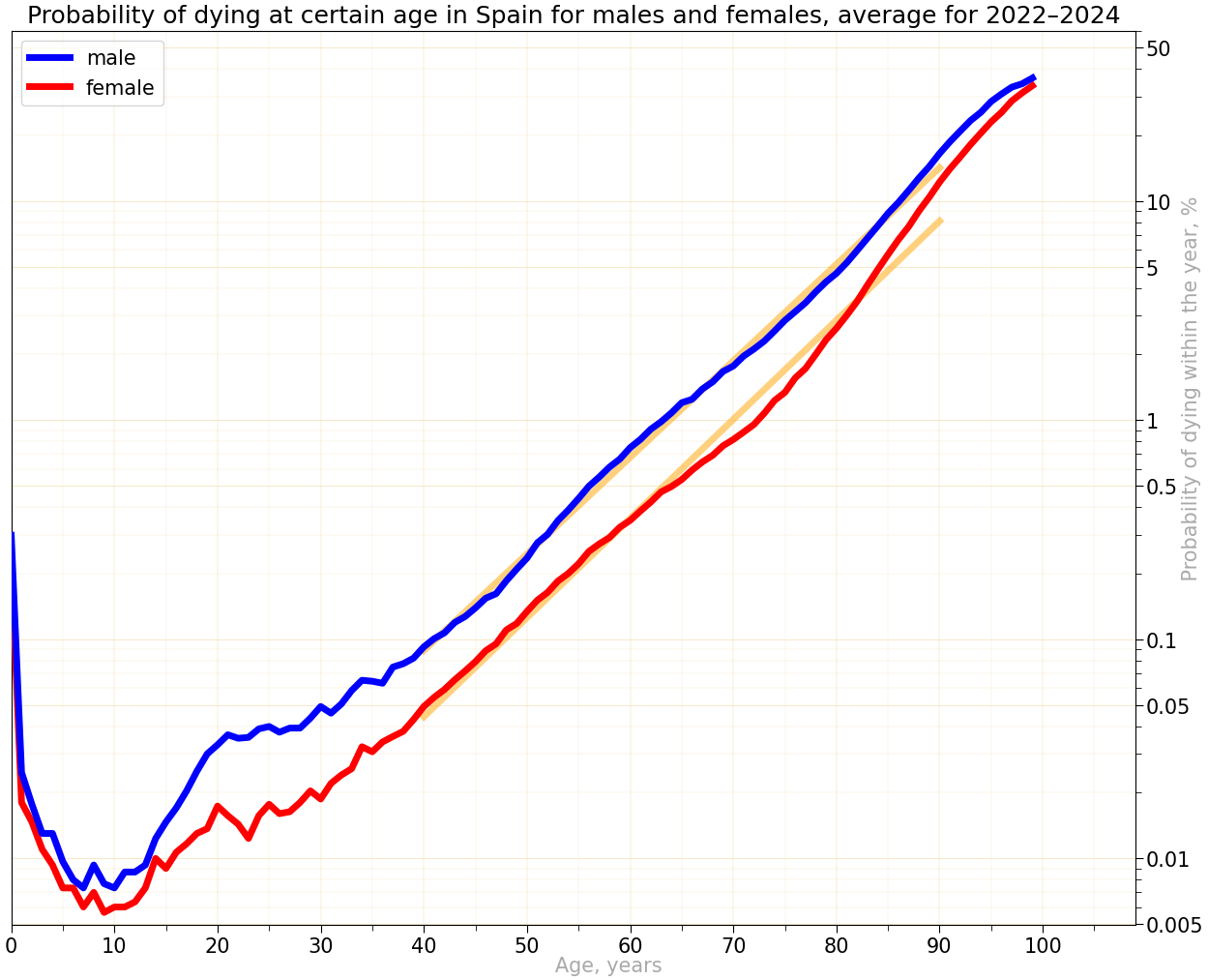
Probability of dying for the US (2015—2019), Japan (2020—2024), France (2023—2025), Spain (2022—2024)

Studies of low-mortality populations typically find that the force of mortality is well approximated by a Gompertz–Makeham curve from roughly ages 40 to 90, with smaller deviations at younger and older ages. The Makeham term improves the fit at younger adult ages by capturing age-unrelated risks, while the Gompertz term captures the increase in intrinsic mortality with age.

Across many countries and time periods, estimates of the Gompertz–Makeham parameters imply that the individual risk of death in adulthood increases steeply with age. A commonly cited rule of thumb is that adult human mortality rates approximately double every eight years of age, although the exact rate of increase varies somewhat between populations, sexes and historical periods. In semi-logarithmic plots of the hazard function this appears as an almost straight line over a wide adult age range, which is often used as a visual check of Gompertz–Makeham behaviour.

Historical analyses indicate that much of the decline in human mortality over the twentieth century was initially driven by reductions in the age-independent (Makeham) component, due to improvements in sanitation, control of infectious diseases and safer environments. In terms of the Gompertz–Makeham parameters this appears as a marked fall in the background risk parameter with relatively stable age-dependent parameters, leading to more people surviving to old age and a more “rectangular” survival curve. Later in the century, gradual improvements at older ages affected the age-dependent component in many countries, contributing to longer remaining lifetimes at retirement ages.

At very young ages the pattern of mortality is different: mortality is relatively high in infancy, falls through childhood and only later begins the roughly exponential increase that the Gompertz–Makeham law describes well. The model therefore does not account for the specific causes of elevated infant and early-childhood mortality, which are usually handled by additional components or separate parametric models in life-table construction.

The behaviour of human mortality at the highest ages remains an area of active research. Some biodemographic studies report a slowing of the increase in death rates or the emergence of a late-life mortality plateau among the oldest-old, which would represent a deviation from a purely Gompertz–Makeham trajectory. Other work argues that much of the apparent late-life mortality deceleration can be explained by data-quality problems such as age misreporting and cohort mixing, and finds that after careful data cleaning the observed trajectories remain close to Gompertz–Makeham forms well into the tenth decade of life. As a result, the extent and universality of late-life deviations from the Gompertz–Makeham law in humans is still debated, and applications that focus on extreme old age often employ extended or alternative models.

== See also ==
- Bathtub curve
- Biodemography
- Biodemography of human longevity
- Gerontology
- Demography
- Life table
- Maximum life span
- Reliability theory of aging and longevity
