= Maximum life span =

Longest recorded life span

Maximum life span (or, for humans, maximum reported age at death) is a measure of the maximum amount of time one or more members of a population have been observed to survive between birth and death. The term can also denote an estimate of the maximum amount of time that a member of a given species could survive between birth and death, provided circumstances that are optimal to that member's longevity.

Most living species have an upper limit on the number of times somatic cells not expressing telomerase can divide. This is called the Hayflick limit, although this number of cell divisions does not strictly control lifespan.

== Definition ==
In animal studies, maximum span is often taken to be the mean life span of the most long-lived 10% of a given cohort. By another definition, however, maximum life span corresponds to the age at which the oldest known member of a species or experimental group has died. Calculation of the maximum life span in the latter sense depends upon the initial sample size.

Maximum life span contrasts with mean life span (average life span, life expectancy), and longevity. Mean life span varies with susceptibility to disease, accident, suicide and homicide, whereas maximum life span is determined by "rate of aging". Longevity refers only to the characteristics of the especially long lived members of a population, such as infirmities as they age or compression of morbidity, and not the specific life span of an individual.

== In humans ==
=== Demographic evidence ===
The longest living person whose dates of birth and death were verified according to the modern norms of Guinness World Records and the Gerontology Research Group was Jeanne Calment (1875–1997), a French woman who is verified to have lived to the age of 122 years and 164 days. The oldest male lifespan has been verified as 116 years and 54 days by Japanese man Jiroemon Kimura. Reduction of infant mortality has accounted for most of the increased average life span longevity, and since the 1960s mortality rates among those over 80 years have decreased by about 1.5% per year. According to James Vaupel, "The progress being made in lengthening lifespans and postponing senescence is entirely due to medical and public-health efforts, rising standards of living, better education, healthier nutrition and more salubrious lifestyles." Animal studies suggest that further lengthening of median human lifespan as well as maximum lifespan could be achieved through "calorie restriction mimetic" drugs or by directly reducing food consumption. Although calorie restriction has not been proven to extend the maximum human life span as of 2014, results in ongoing primate studies have demonstrated that the assumptions derived from rodents are valid in primates.

It has been proposed that no fixed theoretical limit to human longevity is apparent today. Studies in the biodemography of human longevity indicate a late-life mortality deceleration law: that death rates level off at advanced ages to a late-life mortality plateau. That is, there is no fixed upper limit to human longevity, or fixed maximal human lifespan. This law was first quantified in 1939, when researchers found that the one-year probability of death at advanced age asymptotically approaches a limit of 44% for women and 54% for men.

However, this evidence depends on the existence of a late-life plateaus and deceleration that can be explained, in humans and other species, by the existence of very rare errors. Age-coding error rates below 1 in 10,000 are sufficient to make artificial late-life plateaus, and errors below 1 in 100,000 can generate late-life mortality deceleration. These error rates cannot be ruled out by examining documents (the standard) because of successful pension fraud, identity theft, forgeries and errors that leave no documentary evidence. This capacity for errors to explain late-life plateaus solves the "fundamental question in aging research is whether humans and other species possess an immutable life-span limit" and suggests that a limit to human life span exists. A theoretical study suggested the maximum human lifespan to be around 125 years using a modified stretched exponential function for human survival curves. In another study, researchers claimed that there exists a maximum lifespan for humans, and that the human maximal lifespan has been declining since the 1990s. A theoretical study also suggested that the maximum human life expectancy at birth is limited by the human life characteristic value δ, which is around 104 years.

In 2017, the United Nations conducted a Bayesian sensitivity analysis of global population burden based on life expectancy projection at birth in future decades. The 95% prediction interval of average life expectancy rises as high as 106 years old by 2090, with ongoing and layered effects on world population and demography should that happen. However, the prediction interval is extremely wide.

=== Non-demographic evidence ===
Evidence for maximum lifespan is also provided by the dynamics of physiological indices with age. For example, scientists have observed that a person's VO_{2}max value (a measure of the volume of oxygen flow to the cardiac muscle) decreases as a function of age. Therefore, the maximum lifespan of a person could be determined by calculating when the person's VO_{2}max value drops below the basal metabolic rate necessary to sustain life, which is approximately 3 ml per kg per minute. On the basis of this hypothesis, athletes with a VO_{2}max value between 50 and 60 at age 20 would be expected "to live for 100 to 125 years, provided they maintained their physical activity so that their rate of decline in VO_{2}max remained constant".

Average and commonly accepted maximum lifespans correspond to the extremums of the body mass (1, 2) and mass normalized to height (3, 4) of men (1, 3) and women (2, 4).

== In other animals ==
Small animals such as birds and squirrels rarely live to their maximum life span, usually dying of accidents, disease or predation.

The maximum life span of most species is documented in the AnAge repository (The Animal Ageing and Longevity Database).

Maximum life span is usually longer for species that are larger, at least among endotherms, or have effective defenses against predation, such as bat or bird flight, arboreality, chemical defenses or living in social groups. Among mammals, the presence of a caecal appendix is also correlated with greater maximal longevity.

The differences in life span between species demonstrate the role of genetics in determining maximum life span ("rate of aging"). The records (in years) are these:

- for the common house mouse, 4
- for the brown rat, 3.8
- for dogs, 29
- for cats, 38
- for common cranes, 43
- for polar bears, 42
- for horses, 62
- for Asian elephants, 86

The longest-lived vertebrates have been variously described as:

- Large parrots (macaws and cockatoos can live up to 80–100 years in captivity)
- Koi (a Japanese species of fish, allegedly living up to 200 years, though generally not exceeding 50 – a specimen named Hanako was reportedly 226 years old upon her death)
- Tortoises (Seychelles tortoise) (193 years)
- Tuatara (a New Zealand reptile species, 100–200+ years)
- Eels, the so-called Brantevik Eel (Swedish: Branteviksålen) is thought to have lived in a water well in southern Sweden since 1859, which makes it over 150 years old. It was reported that it had died in August 2014 at an age of 155.
- Whales (bowhead whale) (Balaena mysticetus about 200 years)—Although this idea was unproven for a time, recent research has indicated that bowhead whales recently killed still had harpoons in their bodies from about 1890, which, along with analysis of amino acids, has indicated a maximum life span of "177 to 245 years old".
- Greenland sharks are currently the vertebrate species with the longest known lifespan. An examination of 28 specimens in one study published in 2016 determined by radiocarbon dating that the oldest of the animals that they sampled had lived for about 392 ± 120 years (a minimum of 272 years and a maximum of 512 years). The authors further concluded that the species reaches sexual maturity at about 150 years of age.

Invertebrate species which continue to grow as long as they live (e.g., certain clams, some coral species) can on occasion live hundreds of years:

- A bivalve mollusk (Arctica islandica) (aka "Ming", lived 507±2 years.)

=== Exceptions ===
- Some jellyfish species, including Turritopsis dohrnii, Laodicea undulata, and Aurelia sp.1, are able to revert to the polyp stage even after reproducing (so-called reversible life cycle), rather than dying as in other jellyfish. Consequently, these species are considered biologically immortal and have no maximum lifespan.
- There may be no natural limit to the hydra's life span, but it is not yet clear how to estimate the age of a specimen.
- Flatworms, or Platyhelminthes, are known to be "almost immortal" as they have a great regeneration capacity, continuous growth, and binary fission type cellular division.
- Lobsters are sometimes said to be biologically immortal because they do not seem to slow down, weaken, or lose fertility with age. However, due to the energy needed for moulting, they cannot live indefinitely.

== In plants ==
Plants are referred to as annuals which live only one year, biennials which live two years, and perennials which live longer than that. The longest-lived perennials, woody-stemmed plants such as trees and bushes, often live for hundreds and even thousands of years (one may question whether or not they may die of old age). A giant sequoia, General Sherman, is alive and well in its third millennium. A Great Basin Bristlecone Pine called Methuselah is 4,858 years old. Another Bristlecone Pine called Prometheus was a little older still, showing 4,862 years of growth rings. The exact age of Prometheus, however, remains unknown as it is likely that growth rings did not form every year due to the harsh environment in which it grew but it was estimated to be ~4,900 years old when it was cut down in 1964. The oldest known plant (possibly oldest living thing) is a clonal Quaking Aspen (Populus tremuloides) tree colony in the Fishlake National Forest in Utah called Pando at about 16,000 years. Lichen, a symbiotic algae and fungal proto-plant, such as Rhizocarpon geographicum can live upwards of 10,000 years.

== Increasing maximum life span ==
"Maximum life span" here means the mean life span of the most long-lived 10% of a given cohort. Caloric restriction has not yet been shown to break mammalian world records for longevity. Rats, mice, and hamsters experience maximum life-span extension from a diet that contains all of the nutrients but only 40–60% of the calories that the animals consume when they can eat as much as they want. Mean life span is increased 65% and maximum life span is increased 50%, when caloric restriction is begun just before puberty. For fruit flies the life extending benefits of calorie restriction are gained immediately at any age upon beginning calorie restriction and ended immediately at any age upon resuming full feeding.

Most biomedical gerontologists believe that biomedical molecular engineering will eventually extend maximum lifespan and even bring about rejuvenation. Anti-aging drugs are a potential tool for extending life.

Aubrey de Grey, a theoretical gerontologist, has proposed that aging can be reversed by strategies for engineered negligible senescence. De Grey has established The Methuselah Mouse Prize to award money to researchers who can extend the maximum life span of mice. So far, three Mouse Prizes have been awarded: one for breaking longevity records to Dr. Andrzej Bartke of Southern Illinois University (using GhR knockout mice); one for late-onset rejuvenation strategies to Dr. Stephen Spindler of the University of California (using caloric restriction initiated late in life); and one to Dr. Z. Dave Sharp for his work with the pharmaceutical rapamycin.

A mendelian randomization trial in humans found that a 1-standard deviation increase in genetically proxied LDL-C levels was associated with 1.2 years lower lifespan. This presents with an interesting candidate for increasing life span in select populations with such potentially deleterious mutations, since atherosclerosis is one of the leading causes of mortality through causing potentially fatal atherosclerotic cardiovascular disease. Considering many LDL-C lowering drugs are already approved to reduce mortality in select populations, there is certainly not a paucity of research.

== Correlation with DNA repair capacity ==
Accumulated DNA damage appears to be a limiting factor in the determination of maximum life span. The theory that DNA damage is the primary cause of aging, and thus a principal determinant of maximum life span, has attracted increased interest in recent years. This is based, in part, on evidence in humans and mice that inherited deficiencies in DNA repair genes often cause accelerated aging. There is also substantial evidence that DNA damage accumulates with age in mammalian tissues, such as those of the brain, muscle, liver, and kidney (reviewed by Bernstein et al. and see DNA damage theory of aging and DNA damage (naturally occurring)). One expectation of the theory (that DNA damage is the primary cause of aging) is that among species with differing maximum life spans, the capacity to repair DNA damage should correlate with lifespan. The first experimental test of this idea was by Hart and Setlow who measured the capacity of cells from seven different mammalian species to carry out DNA repair. They found that nucleotide excision repair capability increased systematically with species longevity. This correlation was striking and stimulated a series of 11 additional experiments in different laboratories over succeeding years on the relationship of nucleotide excision repair and life span in mammalian species (reviewed by Bernstein and Bernstein). In general, the findings of these studies indicated a good correlation between nucleotide excision repair capacity and life span. The association between nucleotide excision repair capability and longevity is strengthened by the evidence that defects in nucleotide excision repair proteins in humans and rodents cause features of premature aging, as reviewed by Diderich.

Further support for the theory that DNA damage is the primary cause of aging comes from study of Poly ADP ribose polymerases (PARPs). PARPs are enzymes that are activated by DNA strand breaks and play a role in DNA base excision repair. Burkle et al. reviewed evidence that PARPs, and especially PARP-1, are involved in maintaining mammalian longevity. The life span of 13 mammalian species correlated with poly(ADP ribosyl)ation capability measured in mononuclear cells. Furthermore, lymphoblastoid cell lines from peripheral blood lymphocytes of humans over age 100 had a significantly higher poly(ADP-ribosyl)ation capability than control cell lines from younger individuals.

== Research data ==
- A comparison of the heart mitochondria in rats (7-year maximum life span) and pigeons (35-year maximum life span) showed that pigeon mitochondria leak fewer free-radicals than rat mitochondria, despite the fact that both animals have similar metabolic rate and cardiac output
- For mammals there is a direct relationship between mitochondrial membrane fatty acid saturation and maximum life span
- Studies of the liver lipids of mammals and a bird (pigeon) show an inverse relationship between maximum life span and number of double bonds
- Selected species of birds and mammals show an inverse relationship between telomere rate of change (shortening) and maximum life span
- Maximum life span correlates negatively with antioxidant enzyme levels and free-radicals production and positively with rate of DNA repair
- Female mammals express more Mn−SOD and glutathione peroxidase antioxidant enzymes than males. This has been hypothesized as the reason they live longer. However, mice entirely lacking in glutathione peroxidase 1 do not show a reduction in lifespan.
- The maximum life span of transgenic mice has been extended about 20% by overexpression of human catalase targeted to mitochondria
- A comparison of 7 non-primate mammals (mouse, hamster, rat, guinea-pig, rabbit, pig and cow) showed that the rate of mitochondrial superoxide and hydrogen peroxide production in heart and kidney were inversely correlated with maximum life span
- A study of 8 non-primate mammals showed an inverse correlation between maximum life span and oxidative damage to mtDNA (mitochondrial DNA) in heart & brain
- A study of several species of mammals and a bird (pigeon) indicated a linear relationship between oxidative damage to protein and maximum life span
- There is a direct correlation between DNA repair and maximum life span for mammalian species
- Drosophila (fruit-flies) bred for 15 generations by only using eggs that were laid toward the end of reproductive life achieved maximum life spans 30% greater than that of controls
- Overexpression of the enzyme which synthesizes glutathione in long-lived transgenic Drosophila (fruit-flies) extended maximum lifespan by nearly 50%
- A mutation in the age−1 gene of the nematode worm Caenorhabditis elegans increased mean life span 65% and maximum life span 110%. However, the degree of lifespan extension in relative terms by both the age-1 and daf-2 mutations is strongly dependent on ambient temperature, with ≈10% extension at 16 °C and 65% extension at 27 °C.
- Fat-specific Insulin Receptor KnockOut (FIRKO) mice have reduced fat mass, normal calorie intake and an increased maximum life span of 18%.
- The capacity of mammalian species to detoxify the carcinogenic chemical benzo[a]pyrene to a water-soluble form also correlates well with maximum life span.
- Short-term induction of oxidative stress due to calorie restriction increases life span in Caenorhabditis elegans by promoting stress defense, specifically by inducing an enzyme called catalase. As shown by Michael Ristow and co-workers nutritive antioxidants completely abolish this extension of life span by inhibiting a process called mitohormesis.

== See also ==
- Gerontology (extreme longevity tracking)
- Genetics of aging
- Longevity quotient
- Strategies for engineered negligible senescence (SENS)
- Longevity escape velocity
