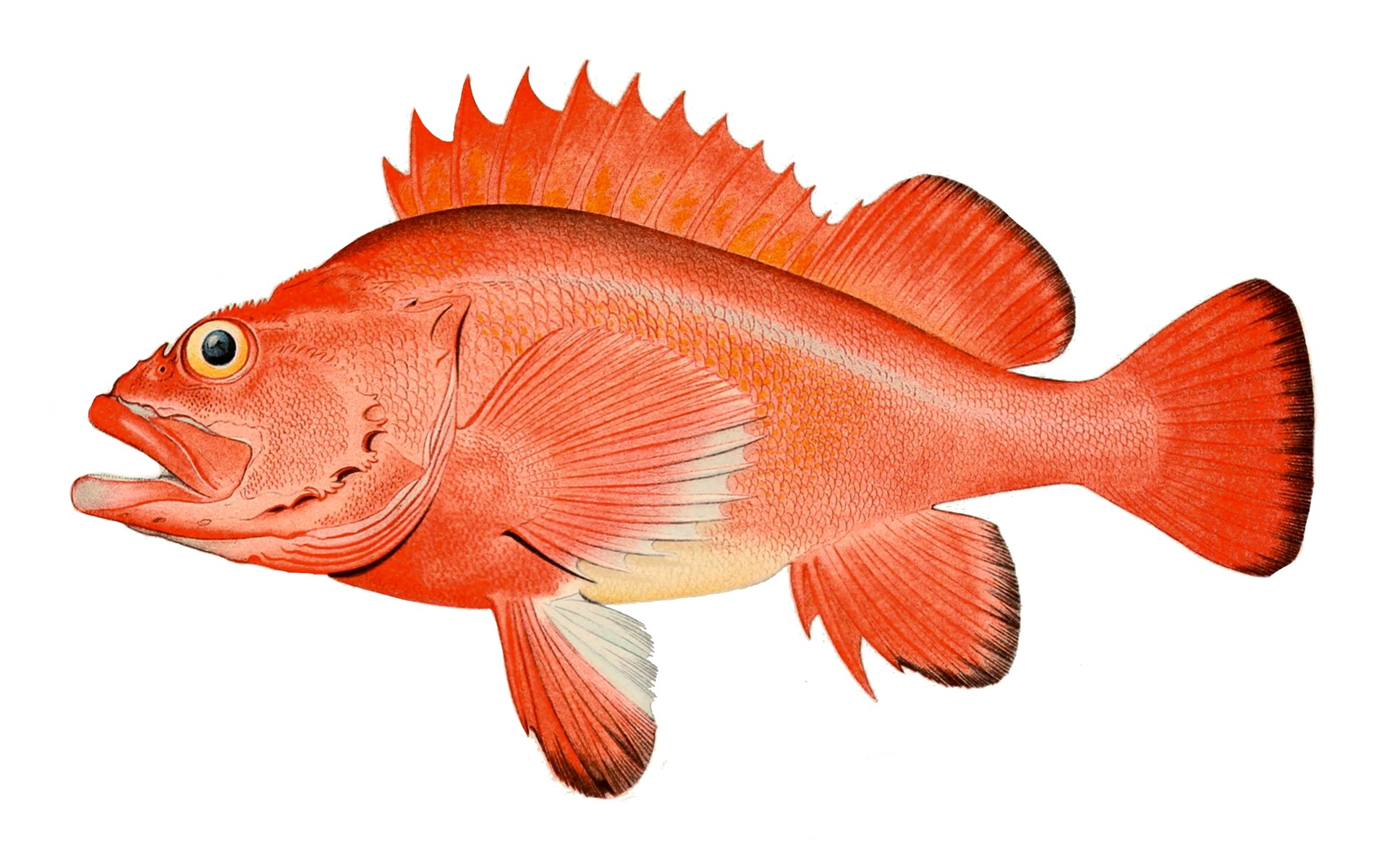

Scientific classification
- Domain: Eukaryota
- Kingdom: Animalia
- Phylum: Chordata
- Class: Actinopterygii
- Order: Perciformes
- Family: Scorpaenidae
- Genus: Sebastes
- Species: S. aleutianus

Binomial name
- Sebastes aleutianus (D. S. Jordan & Evermann, 1898)

Synonyms
- Sebastodes aleutianus Jordan & Evermann, 1898; Zalopyr aleutianus (Jordan & Evermann, 1898); Sebastodes swifti Evermann & Goldsborough, 1907; Sebastes swifti (Evermann & Goldsborough, 1907)

= Rougheye rockfish =

Species of fish

The rougheye rockfish (Sebastes aleutianus) is a rockfish of the genus Sebastes. It is also known as the blackthroat rockfish, rougheye seaperch, blacktip seaperch, longlife seaperch or the blacktip rockfish and grows to a maximum of about 97 cm (38 in) in length, with the IGFA record weight being 14 lb 12 oz (6.69 kg). Similar to many other members of its genus, it is extremely long-lived, and has been known to reach an age of 205 years.

== Taxonomy ==
The rougheye rockfish was first formally described as Sebastodes aleutianus in 1898 by the American ichthyologists David Starr Jordan and Barton Warren Evermann with the type locality given as off Karluk on Kodiak Island in the Shelikof Straits in Alaska.

This particular taxon was previously thought to be synonymous with the blackspotted rockfish (S. melanostictus). However, the blackspotted rockfish is now recognized as a distinct and valid species. Both the blackspotted rockfish and the rougheye rockfish are currently classified within the subgenus Zalopyr. The specific name means of the Aleutian Islands, Kodiak Island used to be considered to be one of the Aleutians.

== Description ==
The rougheye rockfish is so-named because of the two to ten spines found along the lower edge of its orbits. It is pink, tan or brownish with irregular patches of brown of darker color and often a darker patch at the back of the operculum. The posterior part of the lateral line is often pink. An average adult size is about 80 cm (31 in).

== Distribution and habitat ==
Rougheye rockfish are deepwater fish, and exist between 31° and 66° latitude, in the North Pacific, and specifically along the coast of Japan to the Navarin Canyon in the Bering Sea, to the Aleutian Islands, all the way south to San Diego, California. It is found between 150 and 450 m (490 and 1,480 ft), with larger fish living in deeper water than smaller ones. The temperature at these depths range from −0.3 to 5.0 °C (31.5 to 41.0 °F).

These fish inhabit areas close to the seabed, often found amid boulders, rocks, and soft substrates, as well as within caves and crevices.

== Behavior ==
During certain periods, rougheye rockfish form schools, but for a considerable duration of the year, larger individuals prefer solitude or tend to move in small groups. It is considered one of the most long-lived fish species, with individuals thought to live for more than two hundred years.

These fish prey on shrimps, crabs, fish, amphipods, and mysids for their diet. As an oviparous species, they reproduce between February and June, occasionally breeding between October and January.
