= Michael Ristow =

German medical researcher (born 1967)

- Born: April 24, 1967 (age 59); Lübeck, Germany
- Education: Ruhr University Bochum, Germany
- Known for: mitohormesis, antioxidant, mitochondrial metabolism, aging, nutrition
- Scientific career
- Fields: Biochemistry, Medicine
- Workplaces: Charité, Berlin, Germany; ETH Zurich, Switzerland; University of Jena, Germany; Harvard University, Cambridge; Joslin Diabetes Center, Boston; University of Cologne, Germany

Michael Ristow (b April 24, 1967) is a German medical researcher who has published influential articles on biochemical aspects of mitochondrial metabolism and particularly the possibly health-promoting role of reactive oxygen species in diseases like type 2 diabetes, obesity and cancer, as well as general aging due to a process called mitohormesis.

Ristow was born in Lübeck in the North of Germany. He graduated at the University of Bochum in 1992 and received his M.D. from University of Bochum in 1996. He was appointed to the University of Jena in 2005 as a full professor in nutritional science, as a full professor in energy metabolism at the ETH Zurich in 2013, and a full professor in Experimental Endocrinology and Diabetology at Charité Berlin in 2023, also as the director of the Institute of Experimental Endocrinology.

In 2007, Ristow’s group published evidence which could explain the basis of the observed extension of lifespan by restriction of sugar intake. In experiments on a model organism, the worm Caenorhabditis elegans, they found that lowering the availability of glucose extended the lifespan of the worms. It has been known since the 1930s that restricting calories while maintaining adequate amounts of other nutrients extends lifespan across a broad range of organisms. The mechanism has been proposed as a change in the activity of the sirtuins. Michael Ristow shows in his article that this effect can also occur independent of sirtuins, since worms deficient for sirtuins still show extended life span in states of sugar restriction.

Most importantly, Ristow's research suggests that this is a mitohormetic effect, as reviewed in. Hormesis is a controversial concept in which it has been demonstrated that the induction of low-level stress can promote health and lengthen lifespan in some species, while higher levels of the same stress exert detrimental effects. Ristow's interpretation was that in response to a decrease in glycolytic energy production, the worms have to generate ATP by oxidative phosphorylation in the mitochondria, leading to increased production of reactive oxygen species. Due to a vaccination-like response, the organism produces more defenses against oxidative stress, including increased activity of catalase. Supplementation with antioxidants abolishes the increase in lifespan, and so does disruption of an AMP-kinase but not disruption of sirtuins.

In a follow-up study that experienced significant media attention, Ristow and colleagues have shown that supplementing humans with antioxidants during physical exercise blocks the health-promoting effects of exercise, suggesting that free radicals produced during exercise are responsible and required for the effects of exercise.

These findings bring into question Denham Harman's free radical theory of aging, and provide a mechanistic basis to question the application of antioxidants to human health.

Subsequently Ristow demonstrated that the widely used supplement glucosamine promotes longevity of Caenorhabditis elegans and elderly mice. Independently, it was shown that regular intake of glucosamine is associated with a remarkable reduction in mortality in humans, suggesting that glucosamine supplementation may be useful to promote human healthspan.

In earlier years, Ristow published a seminal article describing a genetic mutation associated with extreme human obesity.

Ristow’s laboratory has provided direct evidence supporting the so-called Warburg hypothesis. Specifically Ristow has shown that forced metabolic activity and respiration of mitochondria efficiently blocks cancer growth as anticipated by Otto Heinrich Warburg as early as in 1924.

Independent of his work on oxidative stress, Ristow has recently shown that increased concentrations of the trace metal Lithium contained in drinking water are associated with increased lifespan in Japan suggesting a readily available anti-aging intervention.

== See also ==
- Aging
- Antioxidant
- Mitochondrial hormesis
