= Biodemography =

Field of study

Biodemography is the science dealing with the integration of biological theory and demography.

== Overview ==
Biodemography is a new branch of human (classical) demography concerned with understanding the complementary biological and demographic determinants of and interactions between the birth and death processes that shape individuals, cohorts and populations. The biological component brings human demography under the unifying theoretical umbrella of evolution, and the demographic component provides an analytical foundation for many of the principles upon which evolutionary theory rests including fitness, selection, structure, and change. Biodemographers are concerned with birth and death processes as they relate to populations in general and to humans in particular, whereas population biologists specializing in life history theory are interested in these processes only insofar as they relate to fitness and evolution.

Traditionally, evolutionary biologists seldom focused on older, post-reproductives because these individuals (it is typically argued) do not contribute to fitness. In contrast, biodemographers embraced research programs expressly designed to study individuals at ages beyond their reproductive years because information on these age classes will shed important light on longevity and aging. The biological and demographic components of biodemography are not hierarchical but reciprocal in that both are primary windows on the world and are thus synergistic, complementary and mutually informing.

However, there has been much more synthesis between the approaches to demographic research in recent years, such that collaboration between evolutionary, ecology and demographic researchers is increasingly common. An example of this is the "Evolutionary Demography Society", formed in 2012/2013 to increase opportunities for inter and multidisciplinary approaches to understanding how life history and ageing are related and lead to different population demographics.

Biodemography is one of a small number of key subdisciplines arising from the social sciences that has embraced biology such as evolutionary psychology and neuroeconomics. However, unlike the others which focus more narrowly on biological sub-areas (neurology) or concepts (evolution), biodemography has no explicit biological boundaries. As a consequence, it is an interdisciplinary concept, but maintains biological roots. The hierarchical organizations that are inherent to both biology (cell, organ, individual) and demography (individual cohort, population) form a chain in which the individual serves as the link between the lower mechanistic levels, and the higher functional levels.

Biodemography serves to inform research on human aging through theory building using mathematical and statistical modeling, hypothesis testing using experimental methods, and coherence-seeking using genetics and evolutionary concepts.

== See also ==
- Biodemography of human longevity
- Epidemiology
- Max Planck Institute for Demographic Research
- Paleodemography
- Mortality displacement
- Society for Biodemography and Social Biology
