= Reliability theory of aging and longevity =

Biophysics theory

The reliability theory of aging is an attempt to apply the principles of reliability theory to create a mathematical model of senescence. The theory was published in Russian by Leonid A. Gavrilov and Natalia S. Gavrilova as Biologiia prodolzhitelʹnosti zhizni in 1986, and in English translation as The Biology of Life Span: A Quantitative Approach in 1991.

One of the models suggested in the book is based on an analogy with the reliability theory. The underlying hypothesis is based on the previously suggested premise that humans are born in a highly defective state. This is then made worse by environmental and mutational damage; exceptionally high redundancy due to the extremely high number of low-reliable components (e.g., cells) allows the organism to survive for a while.

The theory suggests an explanation of two aging phenomena for higher organisms: the Gompertz law of exponential increase in mortality rates with age and the "late-life mortality plateau" (mortality deceleration compared to the Gompertz law at higher ages).

The book criticizes a number of hypotheses known at the time, discusses drawbacks of the hypotheses put forth by the authors themselves, and concludes that regardless of the suggested mathematical models, the underlying biological mechanisms remain unknown.

== See also ==
• DNA damage theory of aging
