= List of longest-living organisms =

This is a list of the longest-living biological organisms: the individuals or clones of a species with the longest natural maximum life spans. For a given species, such a designation may include:

1. The oldest known individual(s) that are currently alive, with verified ages.
2. Verified individual record holders, such as the longest-lived human, Jeanne Calment, or the longest-lived domestic cat, Creme Puff.

The definition of "longest-living" used in this article considers only the observed or estimated length of an individual organism's natural lifespan – that is, the duration of time between its birth or conception (or the earliest emergence of its identity as an individual organism) and its death – and does not consider other conceivable interpretations of "longest-living", such as the length of time between the earliest appearance of a species in the fossil record and the present day (the historical "age" of the species as a whole) or the time between a species' first speciation and its extinction (the phylogenetic "lifespan" of the species). This list includes long-lived organisms that are currently still alive as well as those that have already died.

Determining the length of an organism's natural lifespan is complicated by many problems of definition and interpretation, as well as by practical difficulties in reliably measuring age, particularly for extremely old organisms and for those that reproduce by asexual reproduction or cloning. In many cases the ages listed below are estimates based on observed present-day growth rates, which may differ significantly from the growth rates experienced thousands of years ago. Identifying the longest-living organisms also depends on defining what constitutes an "individual" organism, which can be problematic, since many asexual organisms and clonal colonies defy one or both of the traditional colloquial definitions of individuality (having a distinct genotype, and having an independent, physically separate body). Additionally, some organisms maintain the capability to reproduce through very long periods of metabolic dormancy, during which they may not be considered "alive" by certain definitions but nonetheless can resume normal metabolism afterward; it is unclear whether the dormant periods should be counted as part of the organism's lifespan.

== Biological immortality ==
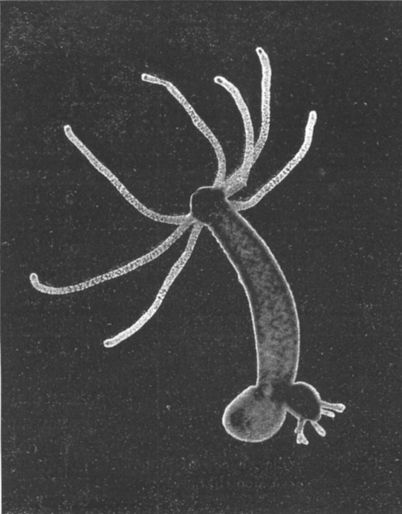
Hydras may not grow old.

If the mortality rate of a species does not increase after maturity, and the species does not age, it is said to be biologically immortal. There are numerous plants and animals for which the mortality rate has been observed to actually decrease with age, for all or part of the life cycle. Specimens of the cnidarian genus Hydra were observed for four years without any increase in mortality rate. If the mortality rate remains constant, the rate determines the mean lifespan. The lifespan may be long or short, though the species technically does not "age" in the biological sense.

Individuals of other species have been observed to regress to a larval state and regrow into adults multiple times. The hydrozoan species Turritopsis dohrnii (formerly Turritopsis nutricula) is capable of cycling from a mature adult stage to an immature polyp stage and back again. This means no natural limit to its lifespan is known. No single specimen has been observed for any extended period, however, and estimating the age of a specimen is not possible by any known means. At least one other hydrozoan (Laodicea undulata), one scyphozoan (Aurelia sp. 1) and one tentaculata (Mnemiopsis leiydi) can also revert from a medusa stage into a polyp stage.

Similarly, the larvae of skin beetles undergo a degree of "reversed development" when starved, and later grow back to the previously attained level of maturity. This cycle can be repeated many times. However, repeated cycles result in physiological deterioration, suggesting that these beetle larvae still age.

== Revival after dormancy ==
If the definition of lifespan does not exclude time spent in metabolically inactive states, many organisms may be said to have lifespans that are millions of years in length. Various claims have been made about reviving bacterial spores to active metabolism after millions of years of dormancy. Spores preserved in amber have claimed to be revived after 40 million years. Similarly, in May 2022 prokaryotic and eukaryotic microorganisms were found in crystals of halite; these could be over 800 million years old but it remains uncertain if they are alive or if they could be revived. In a related find, a scientist was able to coax 34,000-year-old salt-captured bacteria to reproduce. These results were subsequently duplicated independently.

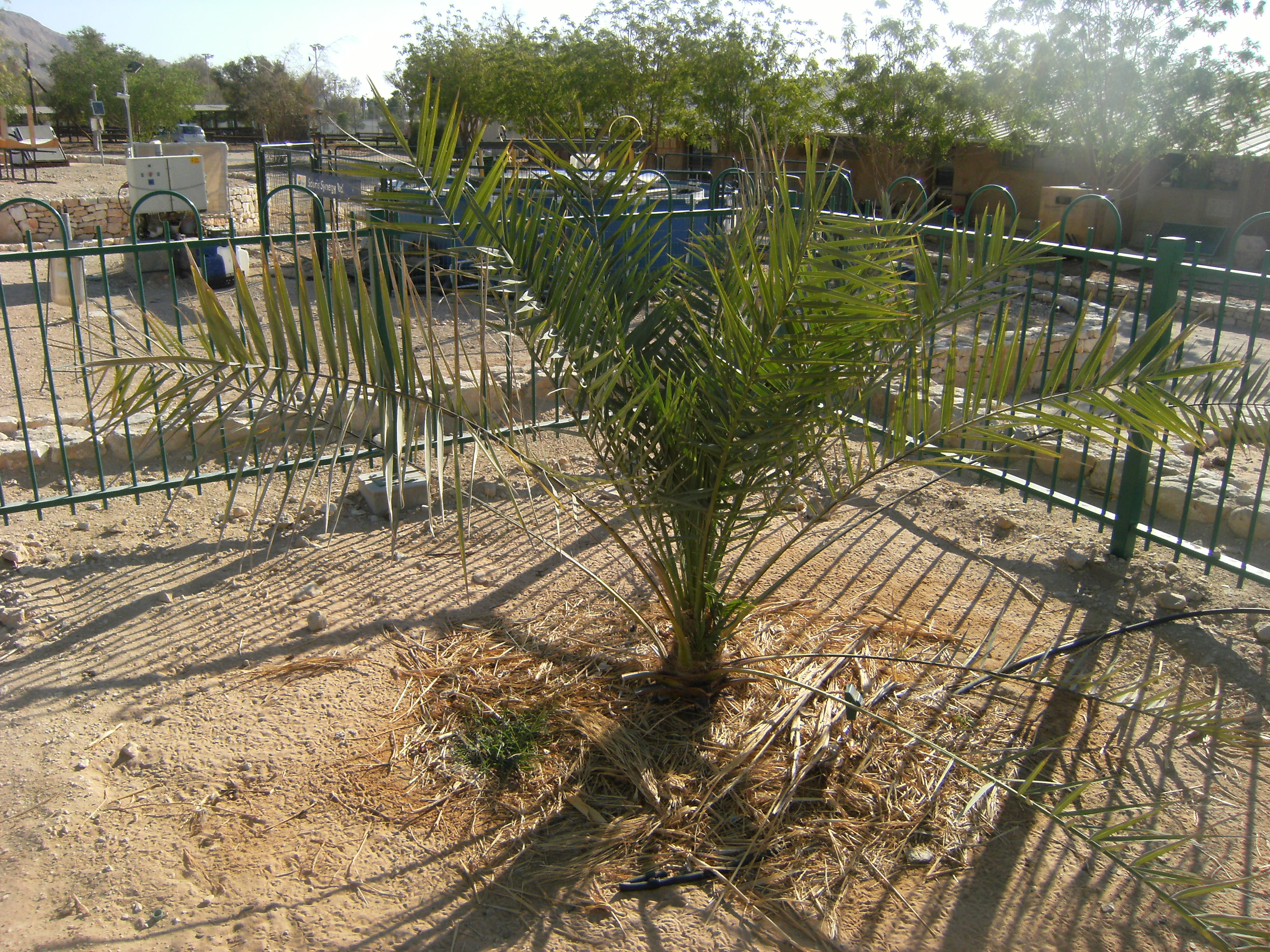
This Judean date palm sprouted from a 2,000-year-old seed.

In July 2018, scientists from four Russian institutions collaborating with Princeton University reported that they had analyzed about 300 prehistoric nematode worms recovered from permafrost above the Arctic Circle in the Sakha Republic, and that after being thawed, two of the nematodes revived and began moving and eating. One found in a Pleistocene squirrel burrow in the Duvanny Yar outcrop on the Kolyma River was believed to be about 32,000 years old, while the other, recovered in 2015 near the Alazeya River, was dated at approximately 30,000–40,000 years old. These nematodes were believed to be the oldest living non-clonal multicellular organisms on Earth. In 2021, biologists reported the restoration of bdelloid rotifers frozen for 24,000 years in the Siberian permafrost. In 2023, it was reported that nematodes of the previously undescribed Panagrolaimus kolymaensis were revived after 46,000 years in cryptobiosis.

Like bacterial spores, plant seeds are often capable of germinating after very long periods of metabolic inactivity. A seed from the previously extinct Judean date palm was revived and managed to sprout after nearly 2,000 years. Named "Methuselah", it is currently growing at Kibbutz Ketura, Israel. Similarly, the flowering plant Silene stenophylla was grown from frozen fruit found in an ancient squirrel's cache. The germinated plants bore viable seeds. The fruit was dated at 31,800 ± 300 years old. In 1994, a seed from a sacred lotus (Nelumbo nucifera), dated at roughly 1,300 ± 270 years old, was successfully germinated. In 2024, a never-before-seen species of Commiphora was grown from a successfully germinated seed that is estimated to be 1,000 years old.

During the 1990s, Raul Cano, a microbiologist at California Polytechnic State University, San Luis Obispo, US, reported reviving yeast trapped in amber for 25 million years, although doubts were raised as to its antiquity. Cano founded a brewery and crafted an "amber ale" with a 45-million-year-old variant of Saccharomyces cerevisiae.

== List of longest-living organisms ==
=== Microorganisms ===
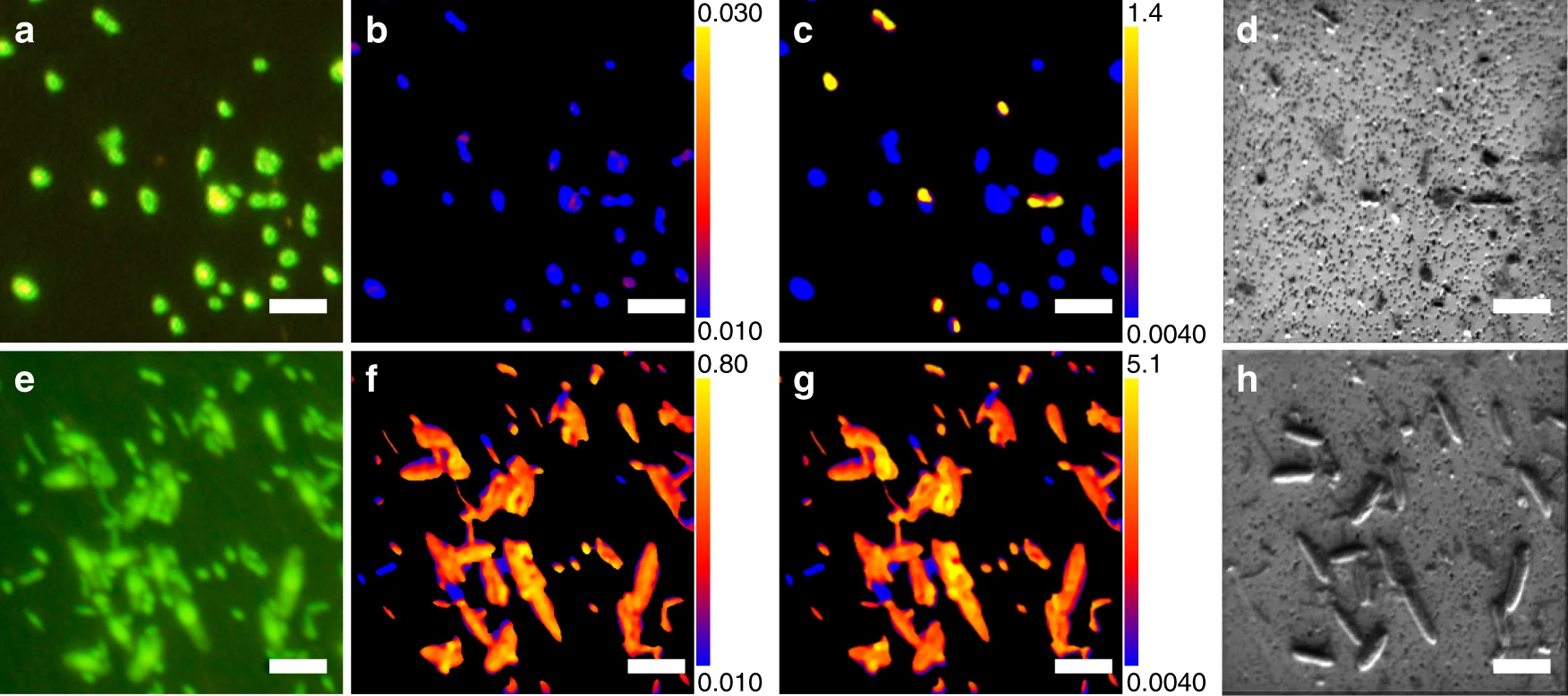
Microorganisms discovered in the ocean floor

Some endoliths have extremely long lives. In August 2013, researchers reported evidence of endoliths in the ocean floor, perhaps millions of years old, with a generation time of 10,000 years. These are slowly metabolizing and not in a dormant state. Some Actinomycetota found in Siberia are estimated to be half a million years old. In July 2020, marine biologists reported that aerobic microorganisms (mainly), in "quasi-suspended animation", were found in organically poor sediments 68.9 metres (226 feet) below the seafloor in the South Pacific Gyre (SPG) ("the deadest spot in the ocean"). The sediments had been dated by previous research using cobalt-based techniques to 4.3 to 101.5 million years old, which would make them the longest-living life forms ever found, yet in October 2024, scientists reported aerobic microorganisms in a two billion-year-old rock drilled from 15 meters underground within a formation known as the Bushveld Igneous Complex in northeastern South Africa, though the age of the microorganisms is unknown.

=== Clonal plant and fungal colonies ===
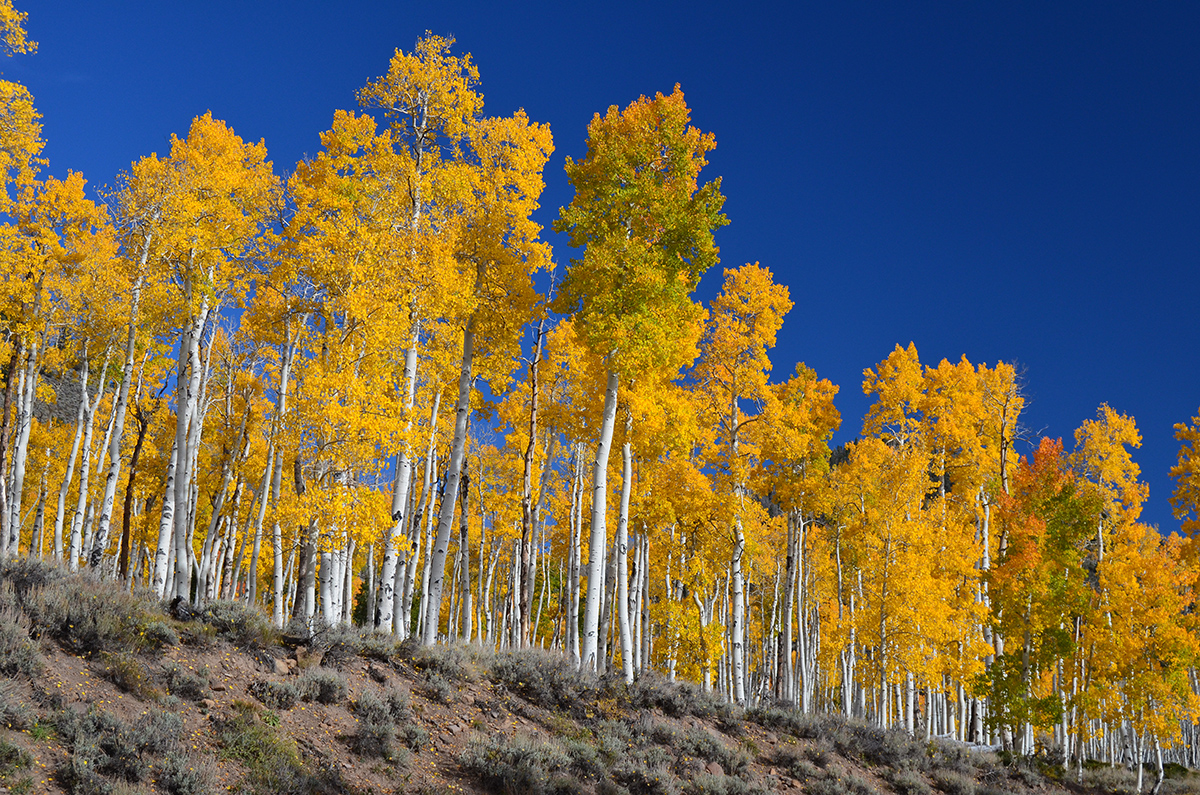
Pando is a clonal colony of quaking aspens that is several thousand years old.

As with all long-lived plant and fungal species, no individual part of a clonal colony is alive (in the sense of active metabolism) for more than a very small fraction of the life of the entire colony. Some clonal colonies may be fully connected via their root systems, while most are not interconnected but are nonetheless genetically identical clones that populated an area through vegetative reproduction. Ages for clonal colonies are estimates, often based on current growth rates.

- A huge colony of the sea grass Posidonia oceanica in the Mediterranean Sea near Ibiza, Spain, is estimated to be between 12,000 and 200,000 years old. The maximum age is theoretical, as the region it now occupies was dry land at some point between 10,000 and 80,000 years ago.
- One of the two last surviving clonal colonies of the shrub Lomatia tasmanica in Tasmania is estimated to be at least 43,600 years old.
- The Jurupa Oak colony in Riverside County, California, United States, is estimated to be at least 13,000 years old. Other estimates place it at 5,000 to 30,000 years old.
- Eucalyptus recurva clones in Australia have been claimed to be 13,000 years old.
- A box huckleberry bush in Perry County, Pennsylvania, United States, is thought to be around 13,000 years old. If true, it would predate human settlements in the area.
- King Clone is an individual creosote bush (Larrea tridentata) in the Mojave Desert of southern California, United States, estimated at 11,700 years old. Another creosote bush has been said to be 12,150 years old, but this is as yet unconfirmed.
- A Huon pine colony on Mount Read, Tasmania, is estimated at 10,000 years old, with individual specimens living over 3,000 years.
- Old Tjikko, a Norway spruce tree in the county of Dalarna, Sweden, is living on top of roots that have been radiocarbon-dated to 9,550 years old. The tree is part of a clonal colony that was established at the end of the last ice age. Discovered by Professor Leif Kullman of Umeå University, Old Tjikko is small, only 5 m (16 ft) in height.
- Pando is a clonal colony of Populus tremuloides (quaking aspen) trees in south-central Utah, United States, that is estimated to be several thousand years old, possibly as much as 14,000 years. Unlike many other clonal "colonies", Pando's above-ground tree trunks remain connected to each other by a single massive subterranean root system.
- "Humongous Fungus", an individual of the clonal subterranean fungal species Armillaria solidipes in Oregon's Malheur National Forest, is thought to be between 2,000 and 8,500 years old. Apart from its extreme age, it is also thought to be the world's largest organism by area, at 2,384 acres (965 hectares).
- A huge colony of the sea grass Posidonia australis in the Australian coast over Shark Bay is estimated to be over 4,500 years old and also the world's largest known plant.

=== Individual plant specimens ===
- Methuselah, a Great Basin bristlecone pine (Pinus longaeva) in the White Mountains of California, has been measured by ring count to be 4,858 years old. It is therefore the oldest known living individual non-clonal tree in the world.
- A specimen of Fitzroya cupressoides in Chile was measured by ring count as 3,655 years old, meaning this species has the second-oldest verified age of any non-clonal tree species.
- The Cypress of Abarkuh, a Mediterranean cypress (Cupressus sempervirens) in Iran, is estimated to be between 4,000 and 5,000 years old.

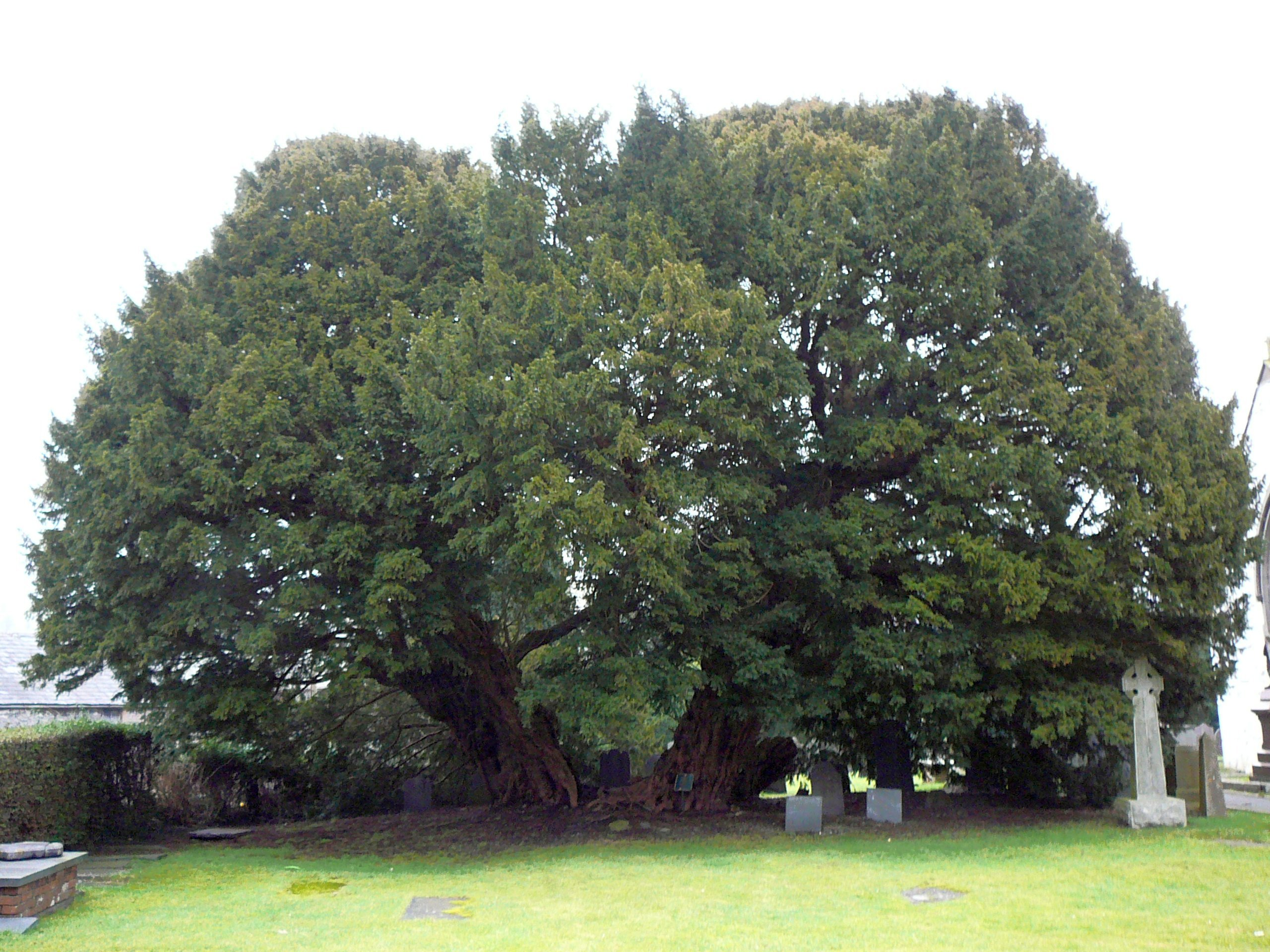
The Llangernyw Yew may be the oldest tree in Europe.

- The Llangernyw Yew, an ancient yew (Taxus baccata) in the churchyard of the village of Llangernyw in North Wales, is believed to be between 4,000 and 5,000 years old.
- The President, located in Sequoia National Park, California, is the oldest known living giant sequoia (Sequoiadendron giganteum) at approximately 3,200 years of age.
- Yareta is a tiny flowering plant in the family Apiaceae native to South America, occurring in the Puna grasslands of the Andes in Peru, Bolivia, northern Chile, and western Argentina between 3,200 and 4,500 metres (10,500 and 14,800 ft) in altitude. Some yaretas may be up to 3,000 years old.
- A Panke baobab (Adansonia digitata) in Zimbabwe was some 2,450 years old when it died in 2011, making it the oldest angiosperm ever documented, and two other trees of the same species – Dorslandboom in Namibia and Glencoe in South Africa – were estimated to be approximately 2,000 years old.
- A sacred fig (Ficus religiosa), the Jaya Sri Maha Bodhi in Anuradhapura, Sri Lanka, is 2,313 years old, having been planted in 288 BC. It is the oldest known living human-planted tree in the world.
- The Great sugi of Kayano, the cryptomeria deemed planted by humans in Kaga, Ishikawa, Japan, had an estimated age of 2,300 years in 1928.
- Jōmon Sugi, the cryptomeria naturally grown in Yakushima Island, Kagoshima, Japan, is 2,170 to 7,200 years old.
- A specimen of Lagarostrobos franklinii in Tasmania is thought to be about 2,000 years old.
- The Fortingall Yew, an ancient yew (Taxus baccata) in the churchyard of the village of Fortingall in Perthshire, Scotland, is one of the oldest known individual trees in Europe. Various estimates have put its age between 2,000 and 5,000 years, although it is now believed to be at the lower end of this range.
- Numerous olive trees are purported to be 2,000 years old or older. An olive tree in Ano Vouves, Crete, claiming such longevity, has been confirmed based on tree-ring analysis. Stara Maslina (Old Olive Tree) near Stari Bar in Montenegro, is estimated to be over 2,200 years old.
- Tāne Mahuta, a kauri tree (Agathis australis) in New Zealand, is believed to be between 1,250 and 2,500 years old. It is the oldest and largest standing kauri tree at present.
- Welwitschia is a monotypic genus of gymnosperm plant, composed solely of the distinct Welwitschia mirabilis. The plant is considered a living fossil. Radiocarbon dating has confirmed that many individuals have lived longer than 1,000 years, and some are suspected to be older than 2,000 years.
- Old Tjikko, the world's oldest known Norway spruce in Sweden, continues via vegetative cloning. Although its trunk may be only a few centuries old, its root system is estimated to be 9,568 years old.

=== Aquatic animals ===
- Glass sponges found in the East China Sea and Southern Ocean have been estimated to be more than 10,000 years old. Although this may be an overestimate, this is likely the longest lived animal on Earth.
- Specimens of the black coral genus Leiopathes, such as Leiopathes glaberrima, are among the oldest continuously living organisms on the planet: around 4,265 years old.

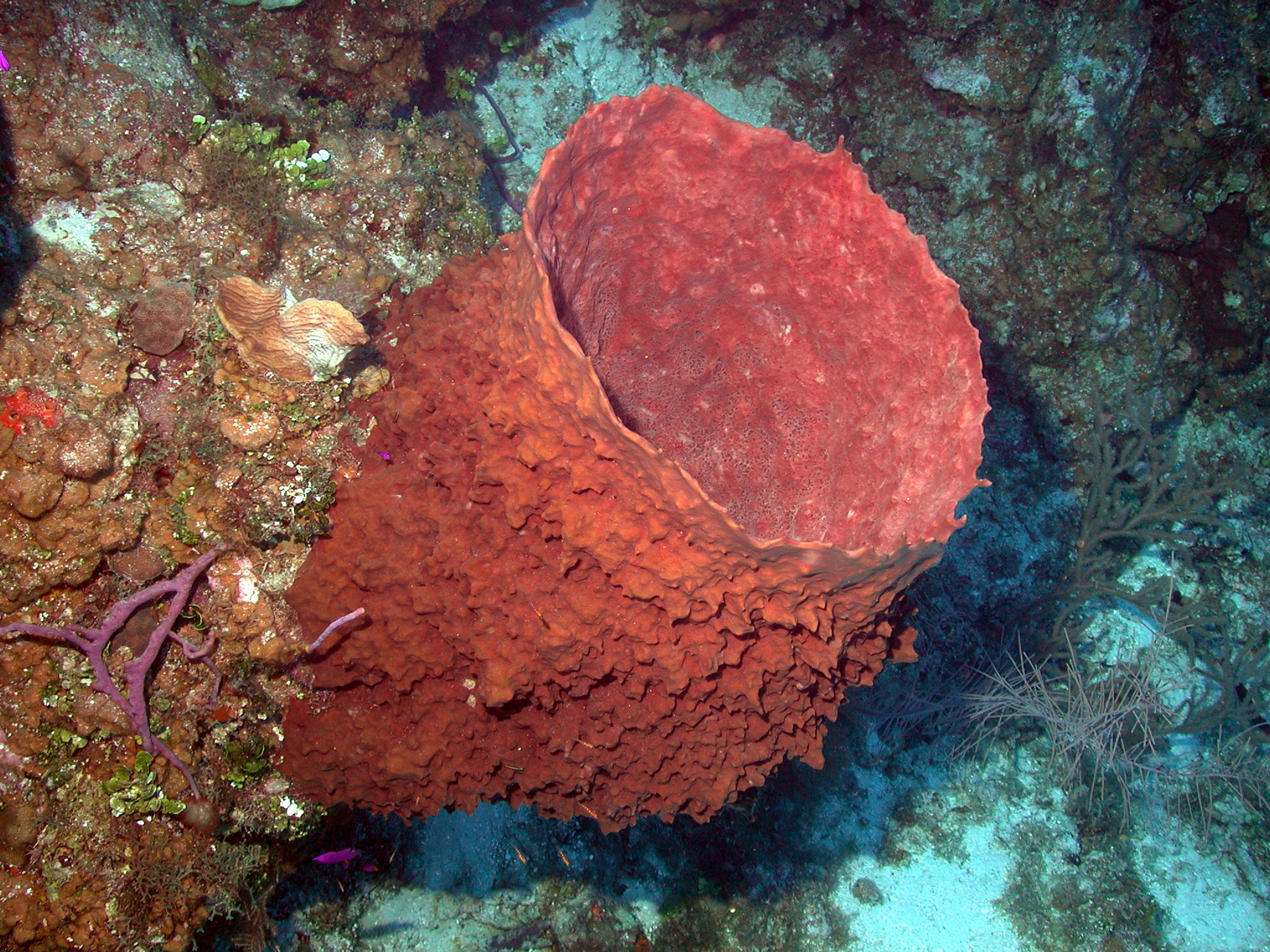
Giant barrel sponges can live more than 2,000 years.

- The giant barrel sponge Xestospongia muta is one of the longest-lived animals, with the largest specimens in the Caribbean estimated to be more than 2,300 years old.
- The black coral Antipatharia in the Gulf of Mexico may live more than 2,000 years.
- The Antarctic sponge Cinachyra antarctica has an extremely slow growth rate in the low temperatures of the Southern Ocean. One specimen has been estimated to be 1,550 years old.
- A specimen, "Ming" of the Icelandic cyprine Arctica islandica (also known as an ocean quahog), a mollusk, was found to have lived 507 years. Another specimen had a recorded lifespan of 374 years.
- The tubeworm Escarpia laminata that lives in deep sea cold seeps regularly reaches the age of between 100 and 200 years, with some individuals determined to be more than 300 years old. Some may live for over 1,000 years.

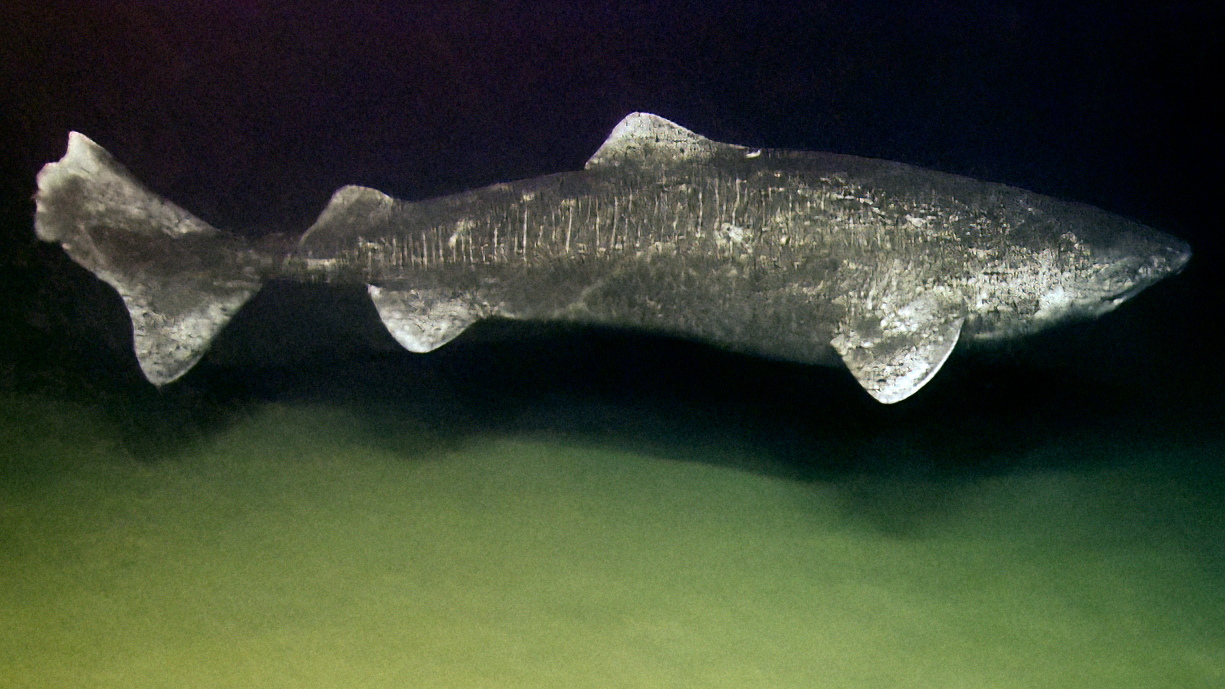
Greenland sharks, which may live upwards of 500 years, are the longest living vertebrates

- The Greenland shark had been estimated to live to about 200 years, but a study published in 2016 found that a 5.02 m (16.5 ft) specimen was between 272 and 512 years old. That makes the Greenland shark the longest-lived vertebrate.
- The maximum lifespan of the freshwater pearl mussel (Margaritifera margaritifera) may be 210–250 years.
- Some confirmed sources estimate bowhead whales to have lived at least 211 years of age, making them the oldest mammals.
- Rougheye rockfish can reach an age of 205 years.
- Specimens of the Red Sea urchin Strongylocentrotus franciscanus have been found to be over 200 years old.
- Many sub-families of the marine fish Oreosomatidae, including the Allocyttus, Neocyttus, and Pseudocyttus (collectively referred to as the Oreos) have been reported to live up to 170 years, based on otolith-increment estimates and radiometric dating.
- The deepsea hydrocarbon seep tubeworm Lamellibrachia luymesi (Annelida, Polychaeta) lives for more than 170 years.
- Geoduck, a species of saltwater clam native to the Puget Sound, have been known to live more than 160 years.
- A Swedish man claimed that a European eel named Åle was 155 years old when it died in 2014. If correct, it would have been the world's oldest, having been hatched in 1859.
- Orange roughy, also known as deep sea perch, can live up to 149 years.
- George the lobster (an American lobster, Homarus americanus) was estimated to be about 140 years old by PETA in January 2009.
- The bigmouth buffalo (Ictiobus cyprinellus), a freshwater fish in the family Catostomidae, has a maximum longevity of at least 127 years based on otolith annulus counts and bomb radiocarbon dating. The population of bigmouth buffalo at Rice Lake National Wildlife Refuge in Aitkin County, Minnesota, has an average age of 80 years, and all individuals are over 53 years, making it one of the oldest populations of animals in the world.
- In 2012, a lake sturgeon estimated to be 125 years old was caught in a river in Wisconsin. Lake sturgeon, found in the drainage basins of the Great Lakes, Hudson Bay, and the upper Mississippi River, are now estimated to possibly live up to 400 years.
- Tardigrades, capable of cryptobiosis, have been shown to survive nearly 120 years in a dry state.
- The great white shark is estimated to live for 70+ years, making it one of the longest lived cartilaginous fishes currently known.
- An orca of the Southern Resident population identified as J2 or Granny was estimated by some researchers to have been approximately 105 years old at her death in 2017; however, other dating methods estimated her age as 65–80.
- A goldfish named Tish lived for 43 years after being won at a fairground in 1956.
- A koi fish named Hanako reportedly died at 226 years old in 1977, making her the longest-lived koi fish ever recorded. However, there is uncertainty as to the veracity of her longevity, with Snopes reporting that no conclusive evidence of her age could be found.
- A lungfish named Methuselah was determined to be between 92 and 101 years old in 2023, making her the oldest living fish in captivity at the time.

=== Humans ===
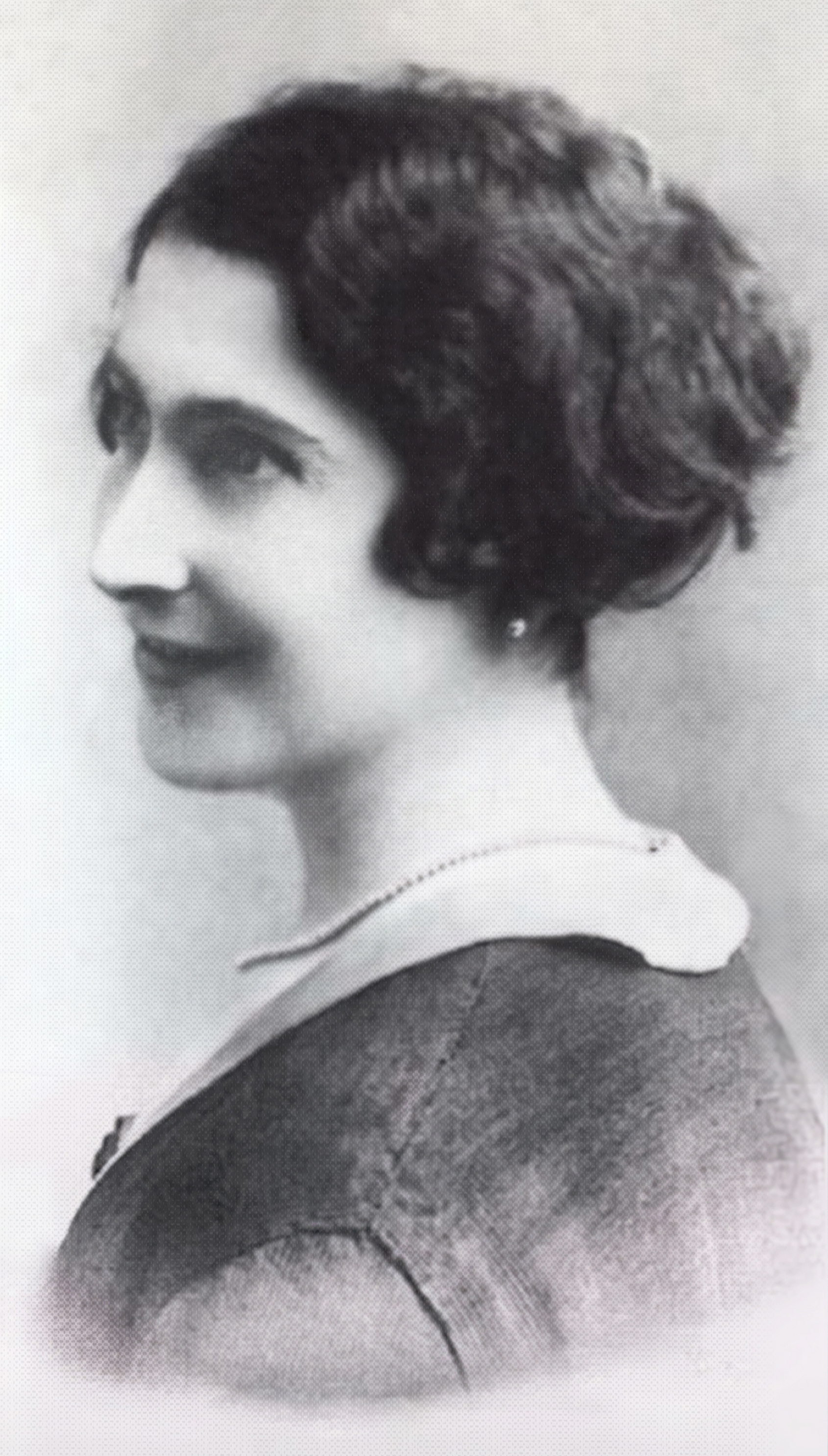
Jeanne Calment, the oldest human in history for which there is reliable documentation, lived to be 122

Humans are among the longest living land mammals.

- Jeanne Calment, a French woman, lived to the age of 122 years and 164 days, making her the oldest fully documented human who has ever lived. She died on August 4, 1997.
- Jiroemon Kimura, a Japanese man, died on 12 June 2013 at the age of 116 years and 54 days. He holds the record for the oldest ever male human.
- The oldest known person alive today is Ethel Caterham, a British woman, at age 117 years, 92 days (born 21 August 1909).

These are single exceptional examples; for a broader view, see life expectancy.

=== Other terrestrial and pagophilic animals ===
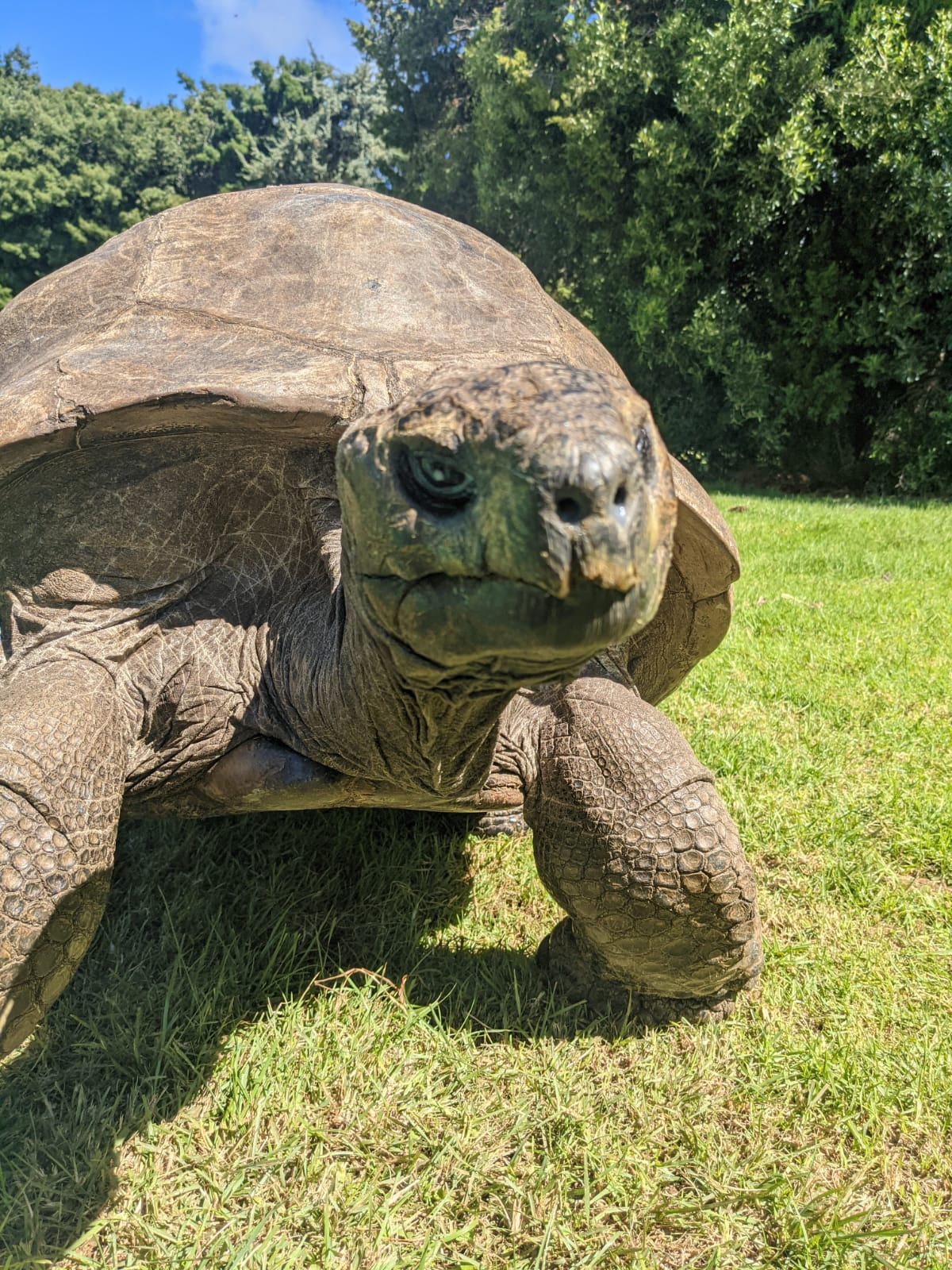
Jonathan in 2021

- Adwaita, an Aldabra giant tortoise, died at an estimated age of 255 in March 2006 in Zoological Garden, Alipore, Kolkata, India. If confirmed, the tortoise would have been the oldest known terrestrial animal to have ever existed.
- Jonathan, a Seychelles giant tortoise living on the island of Saint Helena, is reported to be at least 193 years old, hence the oldest currently living terrestrial animal. If Adwaita's claim is not true, Jonathan might be the oldest known terrestrial animal to have ever existed.
- Tu'i Malila, a radiated tortoise, died at the age of 188 in May 1966, at the time the oldest verified vertebrate. This tortoise was hatched in 1777.
- Harriet, a Galápagos tortoise, died at the age of 175 in June 2006.
- Timothy, a Greek tortoise, born in Turkey died at the age of 165 on 3 April 2004 in the UK.
- The oldest known bird in the world was an Australian sulphur-crested cockatoo called Cocky Bennett, who lived to 120. He could recall phrases such as "one feather more and I'll fly" and "one at a time, gentlemen, please". He lived from 1796 to 1916 and traveled the world with various owners.
- The tuatara, a lizard-like reptile native to New Zealand, can live well over 100 years. Henry, a tuatara at the Southland Museum in New Zealand, mated for the first time at the estimated age of 111 years in 2009 with an 80-year-old female and fathered 11 baby tuatara.
- Dakshayani, a female Asian elephant, initially owned by the Travancore royal family and later by the Travancore Devaswom Board, was 88 or 89 years old when she died on February 5, 2019. She is believed to be the oldest elephant in captivity in Asia and was nicknamed Gaja Muthassi (grandmother of elephants).
- Lin Wang, an Asian elephant, was the oldest elephant in the Taipei Zoo. He was born on January 18, 1917, and died on February 26, 2003, at 86 years, surpassing the previous record of 84. Normally, elephants live up to 50 years, while their maximum lifespan is generally estimated at 70.
- Hakuna, an African slender-snouted crocodile, was gifted to Blijdorp Zoo in Rotterdam, Netherlands, in 1929 by singer and dancer Josephine Baker, He lived there for 85 years until he died on 19 February 2015.
- Henry, a Nile crocodile currently living in the Crocworld Conservation Centre of Scottburgh, South Africa is reported to be 123–124 years old, making him the oldest crocodile in captivity. He is also notable for fathering 10,000 offspring with 6 different mates and for meeting TV host, Robert Alleva.
- A greater flamingo named Greater died at Adelaide Zoo in January 2014 at the age of at least 83.
- Cookie (June 30, 1933 – August 27, 2016), an Australian-born Major Mitchell's cockatoo at Brookfield Zoo, Illinois, was the oldest member of his species in captivity, and died in August 2016 at a verified age of 83.
- Muja, an American alligator at Belgrade Zoo, is considered the oldest alligator in the world. Muja is more than 80 years old.
- Thaao, an Andean condor born c. 1930, died at the age of 79 or 80 in 2010.
- Fatou, a gorilla at the Berlin Zoo is the oldest known gorilla at the age of 68.
- A female Laysan albatross named Wisdom successfully laid an egg at Midway Atoll in December 2024, at the age of 74. As of 2025, she is the oldest known wild bird in the world.
- Bella, a Sumatran orangutan at Tierpark Hagenbeck, is the oldest orangutan ever at the age of 64.
- The oldest living horse on record, Ol' Billy, was allegedly born in the year 1760 in London, England. Bill died in 1822 at the age of 62. Henry Harrison, a resident of London during the time, had also allegedly known Ol' Billy for 59 years until Bill's death.
- Rod, an Egyptian vulture who lived at the Jurong Bird Park in Singapore from 1971 to his death in 2022. Estimated to be 60 prior to his euthanasia, he may have been the oldest known individual of his species.
- The oldest bear on record was Andreas, a European brown bear, living in the ARCTUROS bear sanctuary in northern Greece. He was at least 50 years old at the time of his death.
- On May 27, 1983, a splendor beetle emerged from a staircase in Essex, UK, after at least 47 years as a larva.
- A wild-born black rhino named Elly was the oldest in North America at an estimated 45 years of age, and resided in California's San Francisco Zoo from April 1974 until passing in May 2017.
- The oldest living spider, named Number 16 by researchers, was a 43-year-old female Gaius villosus armored trapdoor spider, at the North Bungulla Reserve, Tammin, Western Australia.
- Debby, the polar bear, an inhabitant of the Assiniboine Park Zoo in Winnipeg, Canada, was the oldest polar bear and third-oldest bear species on record when she died in 2008, at the age of 42.
- The oldest recorded bat, a Siberian bat (previously identified as a Brandt's bat), was at least 41 years old at the time of capture.
- Creme Puff, a cat owned by Jake Perry of Austin, Texas, was born on August 3, 1967, and died three days after her 38th birthday on August 6, 2005.
- Bluey, an Australian Cattle Dog who was the longest-lived dog ever verified, reached 29 years and died in 1939.
- The oldest goat was McGinty who lived to the age of 22 years and 5 months until her death in November 2003 on Hayling Island, UK.
- A wild rabbit named Flopsy was caught on August 6, 1964, and died 18 years and 10 months later in Tasmania, Australia
- A bearded dragon owned by Nik Vernon was 16 years 129 days old when he died on December 2, 2013.
- A mouse named Patrick Stewart (in tribute to the actor) has been verified by Guinness World Records as the oldest living mouse in human care as well as the oldest mouse ever, aged 9 years 210 days as of 9 February 2023.
- The oldest gerbil was a Mongolian gerbil named Sahara, she was born in May 1973 and died on 4 October 1981 aged 8 years and 4 months.
- A hamster owned by Karen Smeaton in Tyne & Wear, UK, reached 4 years and 6 months.

== See also ==
- Earliest known life forms
- Immortality – Concept of eternal life
- Largest organisms – List of largest organisms on Earth
- List of oldest trees – List of longest living trees
- List of longest-living cats
- List of longest-living dogs
- List of maximum animal lifespans in captivity – Record lifespan in captive animals
- Oldest people
- Lists of organisms by population
- Longevity – Longer than typical lifespan, especially of humans
- Maximum life span – Longest recorded life span
- Regeneration – Biological process of renewal, restoration, and tissue growth
