= Tomboye =

- Town
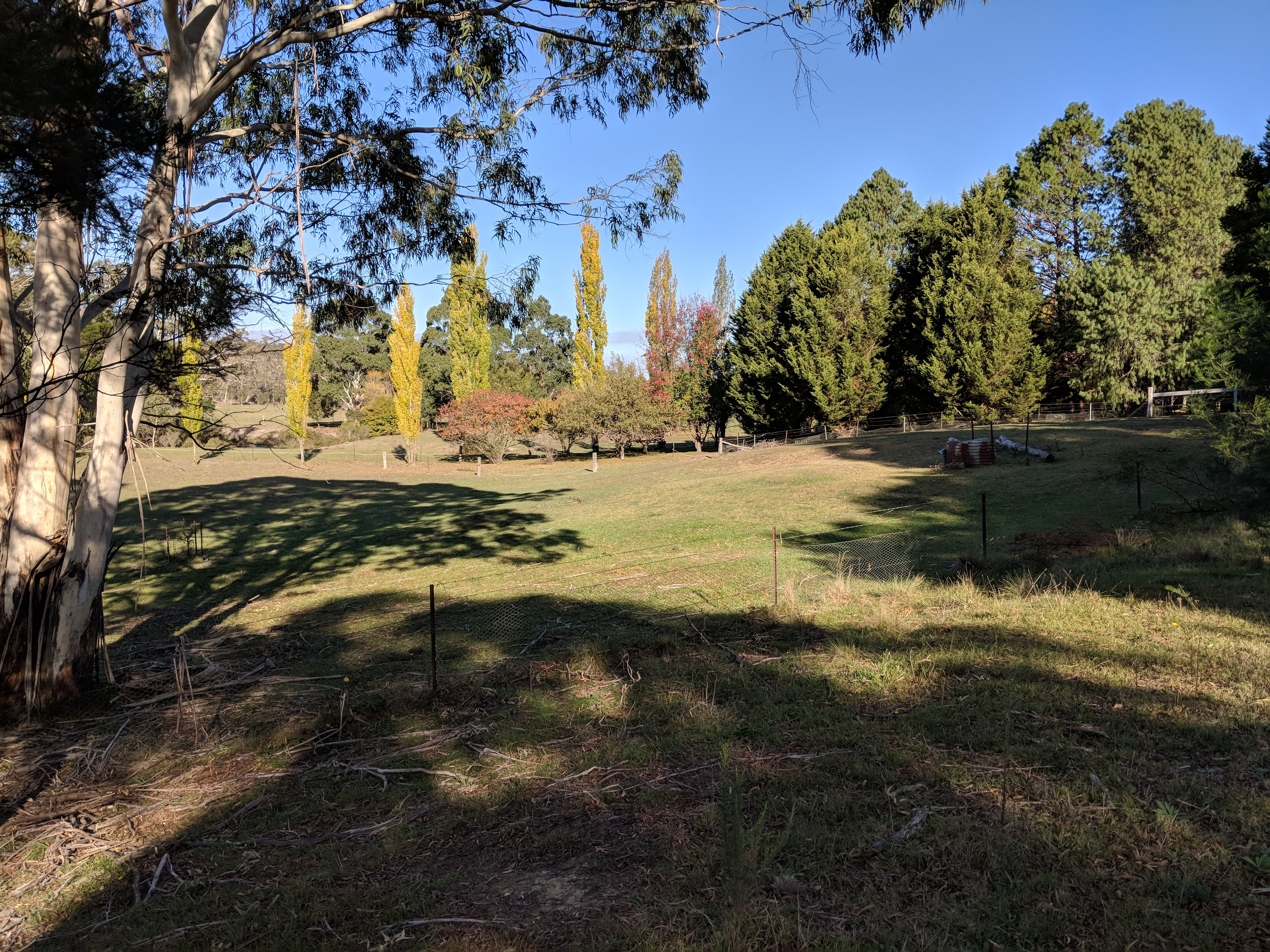

- Coordinates: 35°14′57″S 149°58′02″E
- Country: Australia
- State: New South Wales
- Region: Southern Tablelands
- LGA: Queanbeyan-Palerang Regional Council
- Location: 28 km (17 mi) NE of Braidwood; 93 km (58 mi) SW of Nowra; 90 km (56 mi) SE of Goulburn; 118 km (73 mi) E of Canberra; 257 km (160 mi) SSW of Sydney

Government
  - State electorate: Monaro
  - Federal division: Eden-Monaro
- Elevation: 626 m (2,054 ft)

Population
  - Total: 36 (SAL 2021)
- Postcode: 2622
- County: St Vincent
- Parish: Tomboye
Localities around Tomboye
Oallen	Oallen	Wog Wog
Oallen	Tomboye	Wog Wog
Marlowe	Marlowe	Charleys Forest

Tomboye is a locality in the Queanbeyan–Palerang Regional Council, New South Wales, Australia. It is located on the north side of the Mongarlowe River on the road from Braidwood to Nowra about 28 km north of Braidwood and 93 km southwest of Nowra. At the 2016 census, it had a population of 40. It consists mainly of forest and grazing country.

Tomboye had a "half-time" school from 1867 to 1879. Up to June 1893, it was called Jamboye school.
