= List of longest-living cats =

This is a list of the oldest cats in the world, verified or not, listed by reported age, all of whom have attained the minimum age of 30 years.

Some of the ages reported here are approximate. Others are based on either estimates or hearsay. Few of them have been confirmed by any authoritative agency. Creme Puff (1967–2005) of Austin, Texas, is the oldest verified cat ever, while Flossie (born 29 December 1995) is the oldest living verified cat (as of December 2025), at 30 years.

Row legend

- Unvalidated
- Validated

| Name | Birth date | Death date | Age reported in most recent source | Description | Sex | Country of origin | Cite. | Notes |
|---|---|---|---|---|---|---|---|---|
| Creme Puff | 3 August 1967 | 6 August 2005 | 38 years, 3 days | Tabby mix | Female | United States | | Same owner as Granpa Rexs Allen |
| Baby | 1970 | March 2008 | 37–38 years | Black DSH | Male | United States | | |
| Puss | 28 November 1903 | 29 November 1939 | 36 years, 1 day | Tabby | Male | United Kingdom | | |
| Ma | May–June 1923 | 5 November 1957 | 34 years, 5 months | Tabby DSH | Female | United Kingdom | | |
| Granpa Rexs Allen | 1 February 1964 | 1 April 1998 | 34 years, 2 months | Sphynx-Devon Rex | Male | United States | | Same owner as Creme Puff. Age reported as 26 in 1996 newspaper article, then as 33 at death in 1998. Owner later claimed to have "miscalculated" age |
| Great Grandma Wad | 1987 | Living as of 2021 | 34 years | Thai cat (Wichien Maat) | Female | Thailand | | |
| Sarah | March 1982 | September 2015 | 33 years, 6 months | | Female | New Zealand | | |
| Patata | 1989 | 26 January 2023 | 33 years | Tabby | Female | Italy | | |
| Miez Maz | c. 1979 | February 2012 | 33 years | | Male | Switzerland | | |
| Sasha | 1986 | 2019 | 33 years | Tortoiseshell cat | Female | Northern Ireland | | |
| Rubble | May 1988 | 3 July 2020 | 32 years, 2 months | Maine Coon | Male | United Kingdom | | Reference indicates the cat died just before reaching his 32nd birthday. |
| Rosie | 1 June 1991 | 14 September 2024 | 33 years | Tortoiseshell cat | Female | United Kingdom | | |
| Tiger | July 1988 | 22 July 2020 | 32 years | Ginger tabby | Male | United States | | |
| Kitty | June 1957 | June 1989 | Just short of 32 years | | Female | United Kingdom | | Oldest recorded feline mother; gave birth to a litter of 2 kittens at the age of 30. |
| Jylppy | 5 July 1994 | 20 July 2026 | 32 years, 15 days | Male | Male | Finland | | |
| Spike | May 1970 | July 2001 | 31 years, 2 months | Longhair (Ginger and white) | Male | United Kingdom | | |
| Kika | June 1987 | 3 July 2018 | 31 years | | Female | Serbia | | |
| Nutmeg | 1986 | 29 August 2017 | 31 years | Tabby | Male | United Kingdom | | |
| Chicchi | 1991 | October 2022 | 31 years | | Female | Italy | | |
| Tom | 1977 | 2008 | 30 years, c. 6 months | Black and white DSH | Male | Norway | | Ref cites proof of castration from 1978, in conjunction with the cat's ear-marking. Put down due to poor health about half a year after turning 30 years. |
| Whiskey | 1 August 1985 | 11 September 2015 | 30 years, 41 days | Black and white DSH | Male | United Kingdom | | |
| Flossie | 29 December 1995 | Living | 30 years | Tortoiseshell cat | Female | United Kingdom | | Guinness World Records verified as oldest living cat. |
| Scooter | 26 March 1986 | March or April 2016 | 30 years | Siamese cat | Male | United States | | |
| Henry | March 1986 | 2016 | 30 years | Tabby | Male | United Kingdom | | |
| Missan | 1985 | 2015 | 30 years | | Female | Sweden | | |
| Ebony | 1990 | 16 April 2020 | 30 years | Black DSH | Female | United Kingdom | | |

== See also ==
- Aging in cats
- List of individual cats
- List of longest-living dogs
- List of longest-living organisms
- Loonkito, long-lived lion
