= Marlowe, New South Wales =

Marlowe
- Town
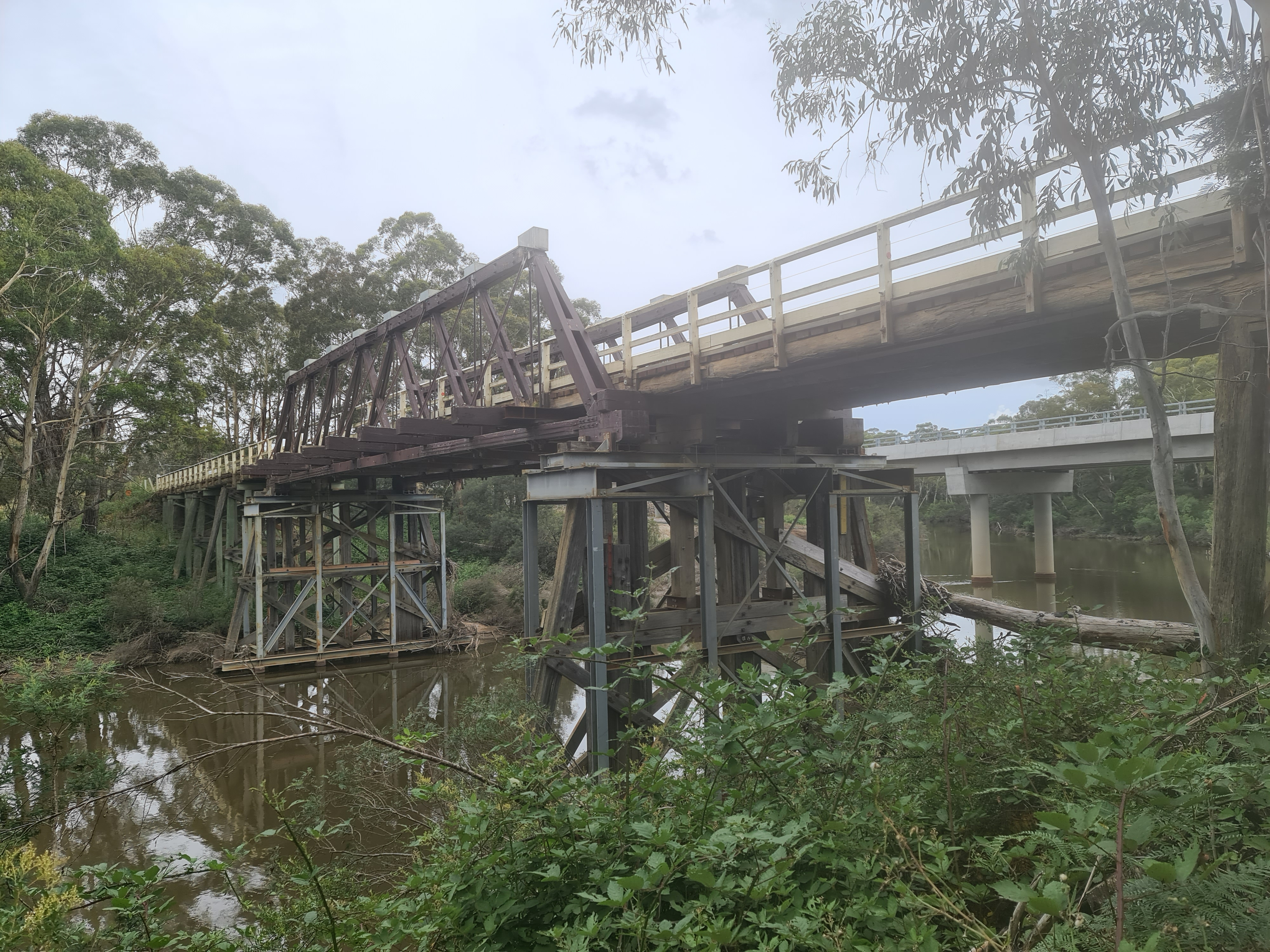
- Old and new Charleyong bridges over Mongarlowe River in December 2020.

- Coordinates: 35°17′57″S 149°53′02″E
- Country: Australia
- State: New South Wales
- Region: Southern Tablelands
- LGA: Queanbeyan-Palerang Regional Council
- Location: 24 km (15 mi) N of Braidwood; 96 km (60 mi) SW of Nowra; 107 km (66 mi) E of Canberra; 243 km (151 mi) SW of Sydney

Government
  - State electorate: Monaro
  - Federal division: Eden-Monaro
- Elevation: 574 m (1,883 ft)

Population
  - Total: 8 (2021 census)
- Postcode: 2622
- County: St Vincent
- Parish: Marlowe
Localities around Marlowe
Oallen	Oallen	Tomboye
Mayfield	Marlowe	Tomboye
Larbert	Durran Durra	Back Creek

Marlowe is a locality in the Queanbeyan–Palerang Regional Council, New South Wales, Australia. It is bounded by the left bank of the Mongarlowe River and the right bank of the Shoalhaven River. It lies on the road from Braidwood to Nowra about 24 km north of Braidwood and 96 km southwest of Nowra. At the 2021 census, it has a population of eight. It consists mainly of forest and grazing country. Marlowe includes the "rural place" and former village of Charleyong in a loop of the Mongarlowe River at 35°14′57″S 149°55′02″E.

The area now known as Marlowe lies on the traditional lands of the Walbanga people.

The first mention of Marlowe (or 'Marlow') was in 1843, as one of the planned townships on the road from Braidwood to Jervis Bay. Following the discovery of gold in the area, an informal settlement, originally known as Taylor's Village, arose around 1854; It was later known as Charleyong. A site for a 'future village' was reserved in 1879, replacing the original village reserve of 1843.

Charleyong experienced renewed prosperity around the turn of the 20th century, when there was employment building the bridge and operating a gold dredge in the river. The last gold dredge at Charleyong started operating in 1910 but was gone by 1913.

Marlowe had a state school from 1869 to 1906, from 1910 to 1931 and from 1935 to 1940, variously described as "provisional", "half-time" or "public". Up to June 1893 it was called Charleyong school and subsequently Marlow school. There was another half-time school at Charleyong in 1928 and from 1930 to 1940.

The village erected a new public hall in 1925 and there was still a post office there at the start of the 1950s, both now gone. There are remnants of a cricket ground and tennis courts—rebuilt in 1953—at Charleyong, and the settlement's old cemetery.

The old Charleyong bridge over the Mongarlowe River is an Allan truss bridge completed in 1901. A reinforced concrete bridge opened on 9 March 2020 has replaced it. The old bridge is expected to be demolished, starting in early 2021, despite some community opposition.
