= Creme Puff =

Creme Puff may refer to:

- Cream puff, a choux pastry also known as profiterole
- Creme Puff (cat) (1967–2005), the oldest cat ever recorded

== See also ==
- "Créme Puff Hands", an episode of Chowder
