= Jake Perry =

Jake Perry may refer to:

- Jake Perry, owner of Creme Puff, the world's oldest cat as well as several other long-lived cats.
- Jake Perry, fictional character in Sweet Home Alabama (film)
