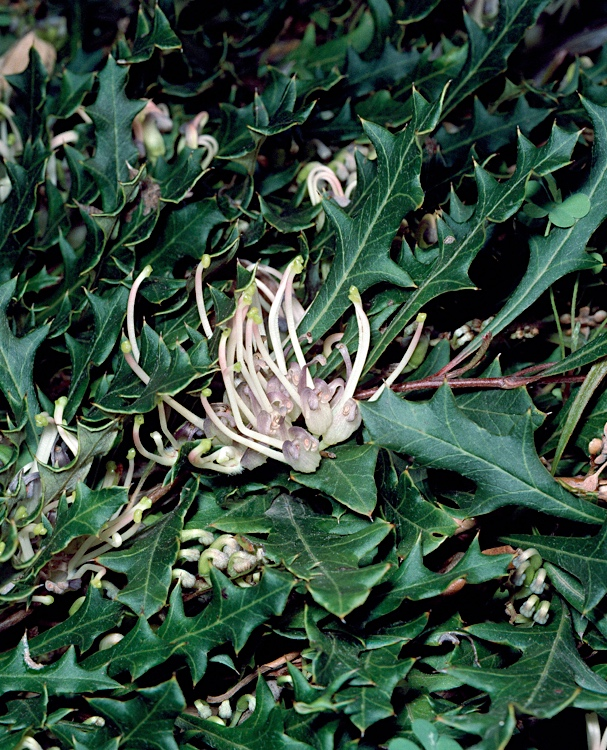
- In the Royal Botanic Garden, Sydney

Scientific classification
- Kingdom: Plantae
- Clade: Tracheophytes
- Clade: Angiosperms
- Clade: Eudicots
- Order: Proteales
- Family: Proteaceae
- Genus: Grevillea
- Species: G. renwickiana

Binomial name
- Grevillea renwickiana F.Muell.

= Grevillea renwickiana =

Species of shrub endemic to Australia

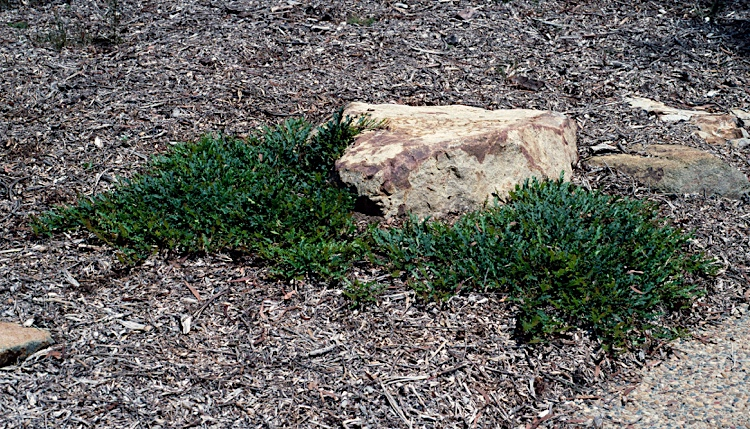
Habit in the Australian National Botanic Gardens

Grevillea renwickiana, commonly known as Nerriga grevillea, is a species of flowering plant in the family Proteaceae and is endemic to south-eastern New South Wales. It is a prostrate, mat-forming shrub with pinnatifid to pinnatipartite leaves and clusters of cream-coloured to pale pink and purplish flowers.

== Description ==
Grevillea renwickiana is a prostrate shrub that typically grows to 20 cm (7.9 in) high and forms mats up to 30 m (98 ft) in diameter and root suckers. The leaves are lance-shaped to oblong in outline, 50–140 mm (2.0–5.5 in) long and 20–80 mm (0.79–3.15 in) wide with 5 to 18 teeth or lobes, the end lobes triangular to oblong, mostly 5–35 mm (0.20–1.38 in) long and 5–15 mm (0.20–0.59 in) wide and sharply pointed. The edges of the leaves are turned down, and the lower surface with loose, silky hairs. The flowers are arranged on one side of a rachis 20–25 mm (0.79–0.98 in) long. The flowers are cream-coloured to pale pink and purplish, the pistil 26–30.5 mm (1.02–1.20 in) long. Flowering occurs in November and December and the fruit is a hairy follicle.

== Taxonomy ==
Grevillea renwickiana was first formally described in 1887 by Ferdinand von Mueller in the Proceedings of the Linnean Society of New South Wales from specimens collected by William Baeuerlen "on heath-ground near the Little River in the Braidwood district, at an elevation of about 3,000 ft (910 m)". The specific epithet (renwickiana) honours Sir Arthur Renwick.

== Distribution and habitat ==
This grevillea grows in open forest in the Braidwood-Nerriga area of south-eastern New South Wales.
