= Mongarlowe, New South Wales =

Mongarlowe
- Town
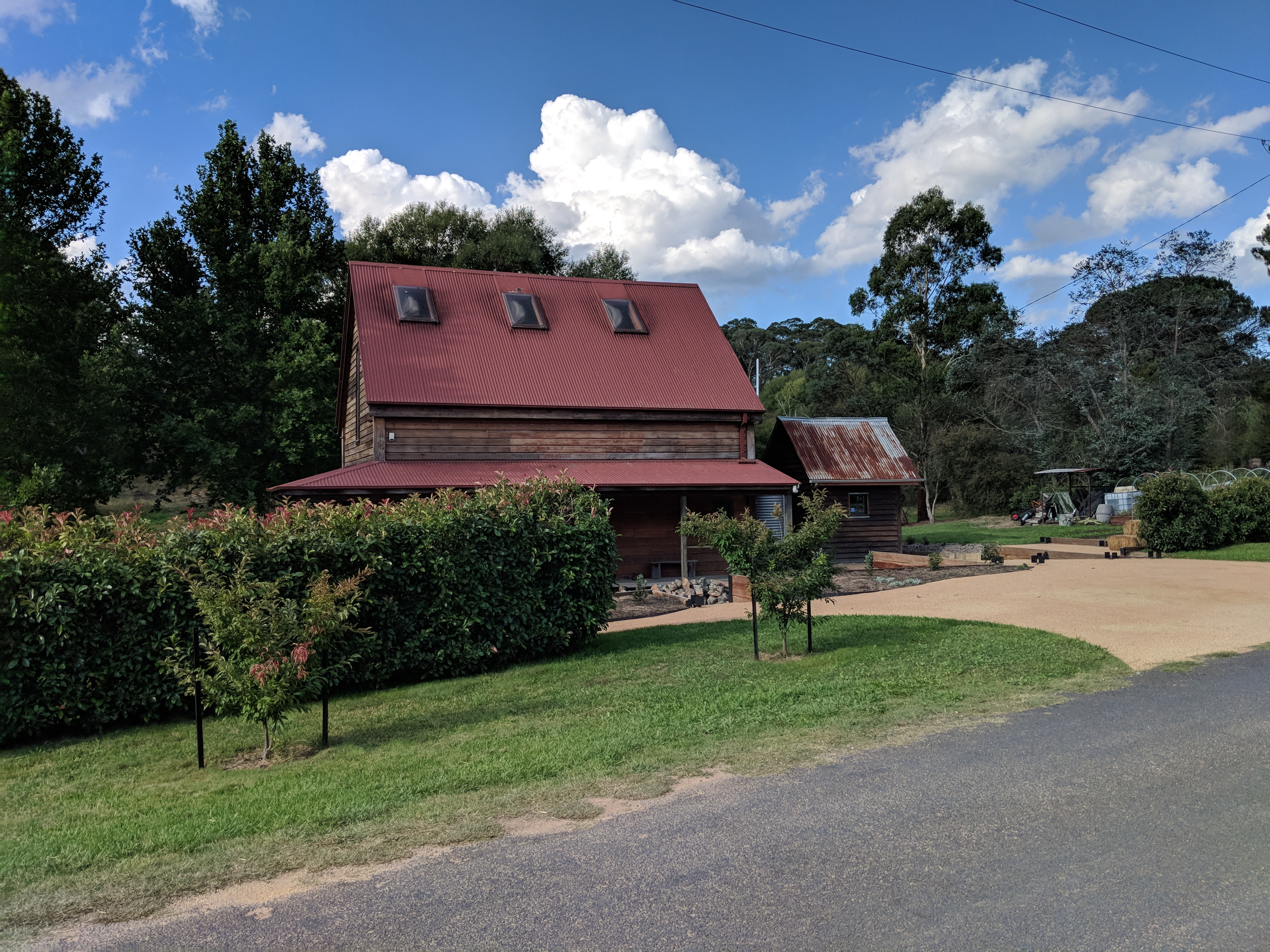

- Interactive map of Mongarlowe
- Coordinates: 35.422°S 149.939°E
- Country: Australia
- State: New South Wales
- Region: Southern Tablelands
- LGA: Queanbeyan-Palerang Regional Council
- Location: 13 km (8.1 mi) from Braidwood

Government
  - State electorate: Monaro
  - Federal division: Eden-Monaro

Population
  - Total: 121 (SAL 2021)
- Postcode: 2622
- County: St Vincent
- Parish: Budawang
Localities around Mongarlowe
Durran Durra	Back Creek	Charleys Forest
Braidwood	Mongarlowe	Budawang
Braidwood	Northangera	Currowan

Mongarlowe is a village in the Southern Tablelands of New South Wales, Australia in Queanbeyan-Palerang Regional Council. In former times, it was also known, in various contexts, as Little River, Monga, and Sergeants Point. The name, Mongarlowe, also applies to the surrounding area, for postal and statistical purposes.

== Location and features ==
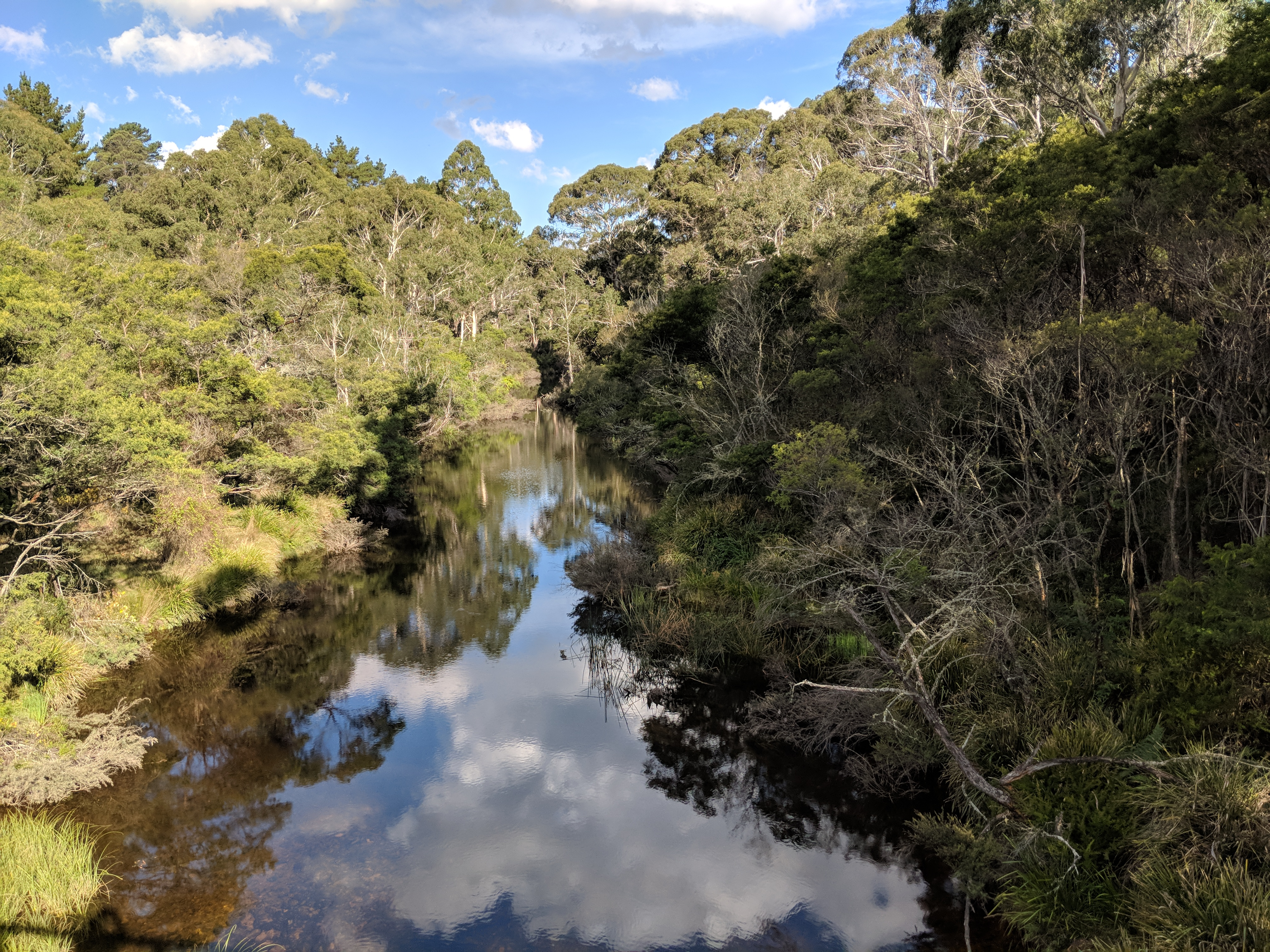
Mongarlowe river in Mongarlowe

It is situated on the Mongarlowe River and about 13 km east of Braidwood. At the 2016 census, the village and the surrounding area had a population of 117.

Several buildings have survived from the 19th century, when it was much larger, as has the village's cemetery.

== History ==
Mongarlowe was a substantial mining settlement during the mid-19th century due to the New South Wales gold rush. It was called Monga until 1891.

=== Aboriginal history ===
The area now known as Mongarlowe lies on the traditional lands of Walbanga people, a group of Yuin.

Dispossessed of their best land during settler colonisation, individual Aboriginal families sought land on which to live. 140 acres of land was set aside as a reserve for Aborigines, in 1879—north of Mongarlowe in the neighbouring Parish of Mongarlowe—in the name of an Aboriginal woman, Mary Ann Willoughby. In 1885, a second reserve, of just under 9 acres, was set aside there, in the name of another Aboriginal woman, Margaret Bryant. In 1893, these earlier reserves were revoked and a new reserve of 50 acres was set aside on the left bank of Currowan Creek, not far from its confluence with the Clyde River estuary, on the coastal side of the Budawang Range. That reserve, Currowan Creek Aboriginal Reserve, lasted until 1956.

Probably due to reasons such as finding a viable means of sustenance, most of the surviving Aborigines living in the goldfields around Braidwood, migrated toward the coast—also Walbanga country—in the later years of the 19th century. Mary Ann Willoughby—already living thereabouts in 1876—and her children were still living near Mongarlowe in 1902.

=== Gold mining ===
Following other alluvial gold finds in the Braidwood district, prospectors were searching the Little River (now Mongarlowe River), a tributary of the Shoalhaven River), as early as December 1851, and there were miners working the Little River diggings by March 1852. The river was called the Little River, because another name for the Shoalhaven was the 'Big River'.

By 1865, there were alluvial gold diggings from the village to the river's confluence with the Shoalhaven River and, in the other direction, upstream for about seven miles, as well as in gullies, particularly that of Tantalean Creek. The gold was patchy and the field attracted hard-working Chinese miners who were prepared to persevere and work in teams, for a modest return on their labour and time.

Chinese miners constructed a water race, ten miles long, from the headwaters of Currawan Creek, in the catchment of the Clyde River, to carry water to sluice high ground in Broad Gully, on the right bank of the river downstream from the village. Extensive remnants of Chinese mining and sluicing works remain evident on Tantalean Creek.

Downstream of the village, just below the junction with Feagan's Creek, the river had cut off a large oxbow, creating a landform still known today as the 'Half Moon', or 'Half Moon Flat'. While the Half Moon was still a part of the river, alluvial gold had accumulated there over thousands of years from the gold reefs around Mongalowe. The shortcut made by the river also created a landform known as 'Sydney Heads', which would become the site of a mining camp. In the early 20th-century, Half Moon would be the location of dredge mining.

The Mongalowe field had both alluvial working and hard-rock quartz reef mines. By 1870, quartz reefs were being mined. The reef mines lay to the east and to the north-east of the village, away from the river. The Day Dawn mine was the deepest of the quartz reef mines in the area and reached a depth of 400 feet. It operated from 1884 to 1891 and again from 1900 to 1905 There was at least one ethnic-Chinese owned hard-rock mine, named for the prominent local Nomchong family, who as well as having mining interests were storekeepers in the village and at Braidwood.

A goldfield of 'Mongarlowe and Shoalhaven River' was proclaimed on 18 July 1896.

Significant mining had all but ceased after 1905. There was a pump gold dredge working at the Half Moon Flat, from 1901 until late 1905. The dredge was removed and taken to Adelong. By 1917, the prospects of any future hard-rock gold mining at Mongarlowe were bleak. However, a bucket dredge operated at Half Moon, intermittently, between 1908 and 1915 and again between 1916 and 1922. During the Great Depression, there was a minor revival in gold mining and mining activity in the area continued sporadically up to at least the mid-1990s.

=== Mining village ===
A settlement arose between the right bank of the river and the left bank of its tributary Sergeants Point Creek. at a location where crossing the river was easy.

In its early years, there were four names used, more or less concurrently. The nearby diggings were known as Sergeants Point or Little River, and those names were also used to designate the settlement. The name Mongarlowe (or 'Mungarlowe') had been in use, since at latest 1870, and according to the Lands Department and their maps, the village was called Mongarlowe from 1889. The village's post office was called Monga—as was its police station—and Monga was used as the village's postal address and in other contexts However, Monga is also the name of another locality—upstream on the river, near the junction of the Clyde Road and the road from Reidsdale—where a village site was officially reserved in 1881. By 1891, confusion with that other, relatively nearby Monga, was leading to mail being directed to the wrong place. Residents asked that the postal name be changed to Mongarlowe, which happened in the same year. From that time, Mongarlowe was the only official name for the village. The name Sergeants Point also continued to be used locally, until at least the very earliest years of the 20th century. The road from Braidwood to Mongalowe is still known as Little River Road.

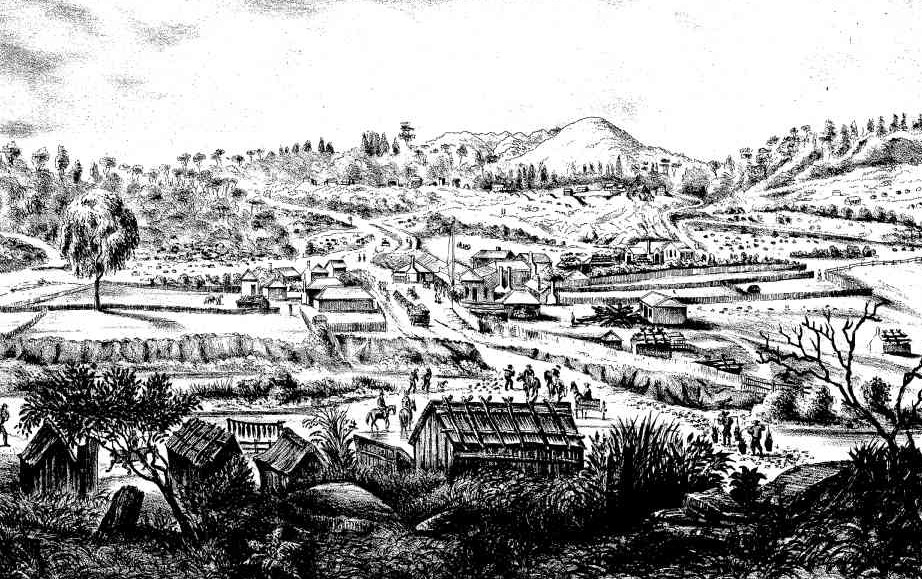
Village c.1870, with Chinese huts in the foreground.and river crossing at centre.

The village became the centre for a number of smaller mining camps spread widely throughout the area. By 1870, the village had "two or three hotels, a large store, a good schoolhouse, and a police station." The goldfields area had ten hotels, nine stores, three mills, and, in 1868, a population of 1,332, of whom 350 were Chinese.

As a result of the Crown Lands Act of 1884, the boundaries of the village of Mongarlow were officially proclaimed on 29 July 1889, although the settlement had been in existence for many years before then. The haphazard arrangement of the village's street plan reflected the original settlement, rather than a carefully planned village.

A bridge across the Mongarlowe River (previously Little River) was opened at Mongarlow in 1894. The bridge is a six-span timber trestle and beam bridge, with a timber deck. Prior to the bridge, pedestrians crossed the river using stepping stones. The old ford was just downstream of the bridge. The realignment of the main road from the ford, to pass over the bridge, left the town's hotel with its rear to the main road.

In 1905, the village had a "police station, hotel, three stores, public school, blacksmith's shop, three churches; a Chinese joss house, and private residences", and a population of ''about 700 Europeans and 23 Chinese.'' The Chinese temple (or 'joss house') and its burial ground stood on the left bank of the river, just downstream of the old ford. The village had a public school from 1863 to 1963.

The village's hotel was known as the 'Rising Sun Hotel'. It was burned down in July 1907, in what was later found to be a case of arson. It was rebuilt but lost its licence soon afterward. It is now a private residence and one of the few remaining original public buildings in the village, the others being the old post office and schoolhouse. Another original building, the old lock-up, has been removed and reinstated at the Braidwood Museum.

In January 1919, the village was severely affected by bushfire, losing its police station, both its Anglican and Catholic churches, several residences, a crushing battery. and the Chinese temple (or 'joss house'). It was a catastrophe for a village already in decline. At the time of the fire, the population was 'around 100" and only one Chinese resident remained by 1922.

Another minor population boom occurred, during the Depression, when many returned to distill eucalyptus oil and search again for gold.

A new Catholic church was opened in 1937. After some year of disuse, the church was demolished.

There was a proposal for a 98 lot subdivision in proximity to the village which was cancelled in 2008 under pressure from concerned residents.

== Heritage listings ==
Mongarlowe has a number of heritage-listed sites, including:

- Half Moon Road: Half Moon Farm House

Three of the four known sites, at which the critically endangered Mongarlowe Mallee (Eucalyptus recurva) exists, are close to Mongarlowe. Only six plants existed in 2011.
