= Half Moon Farm House =

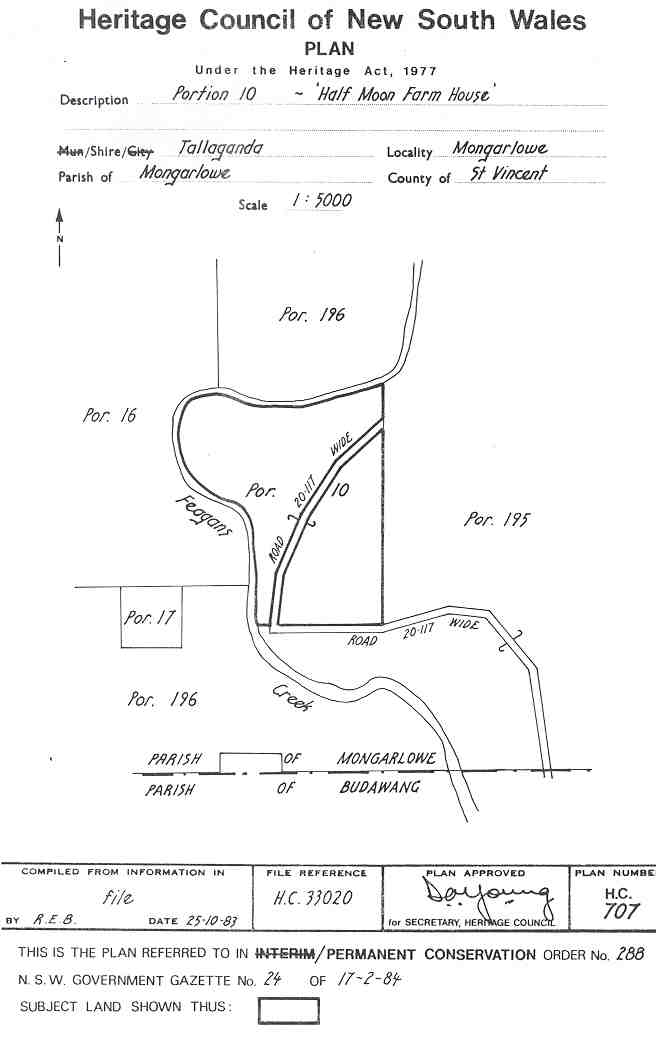
- Heritage boundaries

- Location within New South Wales Location within Australia
- 35.3923°S 149.9616°E
- Location: Half Moon Road, Mongarlowe, Queanbeyan-Palerang Region, New South Wales, Australia

New South Wales Heritage Register
- Official name: Half Moon Farm House
- Type: state heritage (built)
- Designated: 2 April 1999
- Reference no.: 288
- Type: House
- Category: Residential buildings (private)

Half Moon Farm House is a heritage-listed house located on Half Moon Road at Mongarlowe, in the Southern Tablelands region of New South Wales, Australia. It was added to the New South Wales State Heritage Register on 2 April 1999.

== Heritage listing ==
Half Moon Farm House was listed on the New South Wales State Heritage Register on 2 April 1999.
