= George (lobster) =

American lobster (born c. 1869)

- Breed: American lobster
- Sex: Male
- Born: c. 1869; 157 years ago (Note: Current status unknown)
- Known for: Old age
- Weight: 20 lb (9.1 kg)

George (hatched approximately 1869) is an American lobster owned briefly by the City Crab and Seafood restaurant in New York City. Captured in December 2008, he was released back into the wild in January 2009. George weighed 20 pounds (9.1 kg), and had an estimated age of 140 years at the time.

== Capture ==
George was captured off the coast of Newfoundland in December 2008, and sold to the City Crab and Seafood restaurant in Park Avenue South for US$100. He arrived at the restaurant on New Year's Eve. Keith Valenti, the restaurant manager, said that "We never intended him to be sold, just draw attention to the restaurant, and he did." Instead, the lobster had been "sitting in the restaurant's tank and acting as a sort of mascot"; Valenti explained that "we bought a big lobster, started taking pictures with kids and it worked out real well". George was given his name by a young patron of the restaurant, and was treated as a pet. He lived in the tank for approximately ten days.

== Release ==
Two customers told animal rights group PETA about George being kept in the restaurant, and the group began lobbying for his freedom. After initially refusing to release him, Valenti later said that it was a "no brainer" to release George back into the wild, and that it "seemed like the right thing to do." He was taken from the restaurant to Portsmouth, New Hampshire, where an expert in crustaceans would help ease his transition to the wild. George was then driven to Maine, and released into waters north of Kennebunkport by PETA members, on January 10. The area was chosen because lobster fishing was forbidden there. George made the journey in a plastic foam cooler, filled with seaweed and wet newspaper. Vegetarian restaurateur Larry Fleming from Maine handled the trip. He said that George would be "very happy" when returned to the ocean. In a statement, Ingrid Newkirk of PETA said

We applaud the folks at City Crab and Seafood for their compassionate decision to allow this noble old-timer to live out his days in freedom and peace. We hope that their kind gesture serves as an example that these intriguing animals don't deserve to be confined to tiny tanks or boiled alive.

== Weight and age ==
George weighed 20 pounds (9.1 kg), and was estimated to be 140 years old, placing his year of birth around 1869. The age of lobsters can be difficult to determine, but can be estimated based on molting rate and the increase in size after a molt. Though some scientists claim that lobsters cannot live for much longer than 100 years, Valenti claims it is fairly common. PETA did not reveal how they had calculated the age, but Valenti explained that lobster age can be estimated by weight, with the weight increasing by around 1 pound (450 g) for every seven to ten years of life. He added that "I've been here for 12 years, and that's the biggest lobster I've ever seen".

== See also ==
- List of long-living organisms
