= Brantevik =

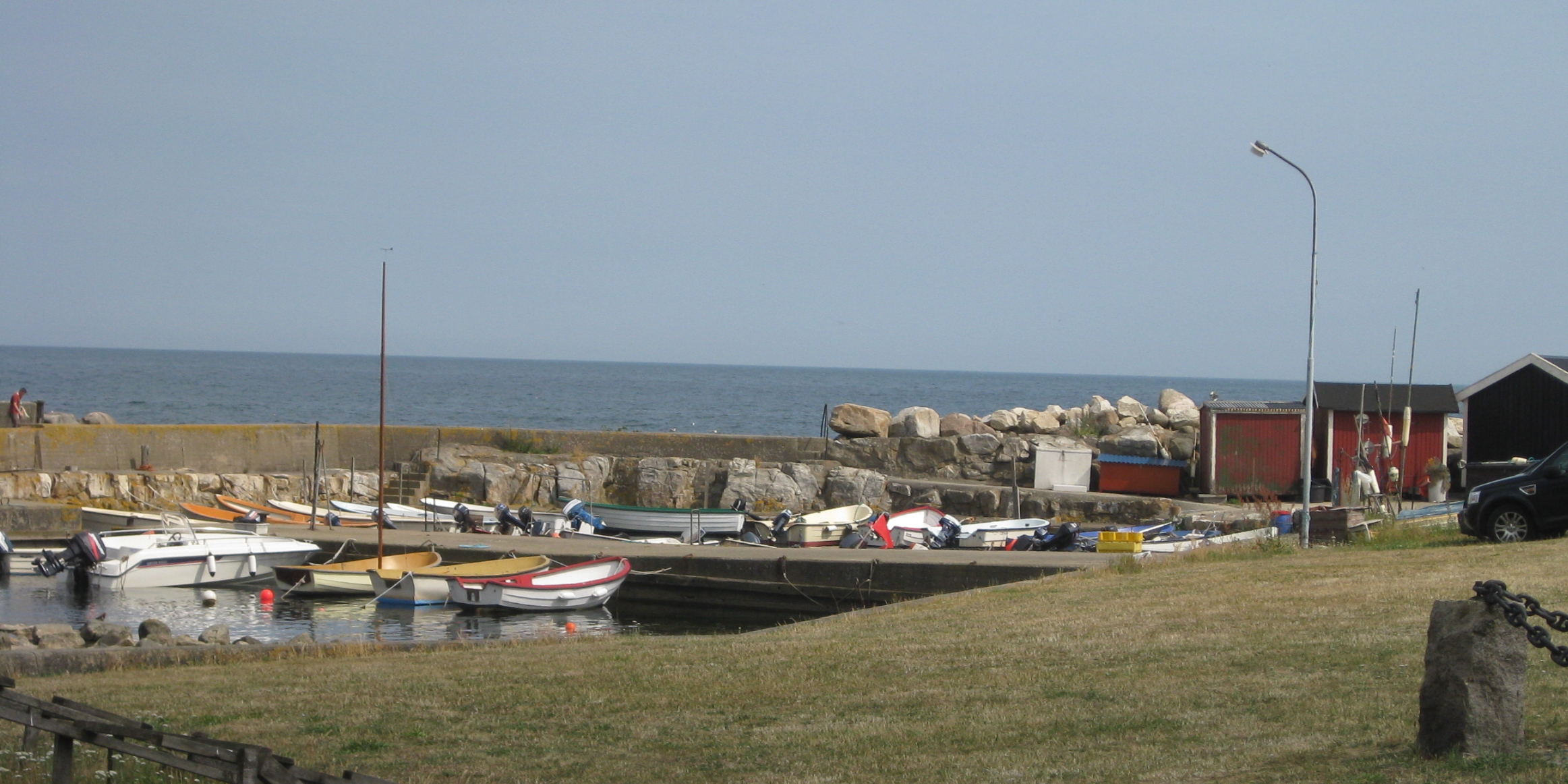

- Location within Skåne Location within Sweden
- Coordinates: 55°30′55″N 14°20′37″E
- Country: Sweden
- Province: Skåne
- County: Skåne County
- Municipality: Simrishamn Municipality

Area
  - Total: 0.69 km^{2} (0.27 sq mi)

Population (31 December 2010)
  - Total: 409
  - Density: 593/km^{2} (1,540/sq mi)
- Time zone: UTC+1 (CET)
  - Summer (DST): UTC+2 (CEST)

Brantevik is a locality situated in Simrishamn Municipality, Skåne County, Sweden with 409 inhabitants in 2010. It was the home of the Brantevik Eel, a 150-year-old eel. It is also home to the Branteviks Museum, which displays maritime equipment used in the harbour station from 1855 till 1957. The first known settlement in Brantevik dates from 1755. The "Sjöassuransföreningen Hoppet" was founded in Brantevik in 1871. It functioned as an insurance association for ships from Brantevik. When the association was founded, Brantevik had 23 ships. The number of ships grew rapidly during the following years, and in 1899 118 sailing ships of different kinds were registered in Brantevik. It has been said that during its peak years in the late 1800's, Brantevik had the largest sailing fleet in Sweden. However, during the 1900's the number of ships decreased until 1959, when the last ships were sold. The insurance company was liquidated in 1955. The Brantevik Coat of Arms was approved on 27 November 1979, by the Swedish National Archive's heraldic section (Dnr 289/79). The artist Helge Lundström later enlarged the coat of arms and painted it on the shield located at the Branteviks Museum.
