= Flossie (cat) =

Oldest living cat (born 1995)

- Species: Felis catus
- Sex: Female
- Born: 29 December 1995 (age 30); St Helens, Merseyside, United Kingdom
- Known for: Oldest verified living cat in the world (as of November 2022) by Guinness World Records
- Owner: Victoria Green
- Appearance: Domestic short-haired cat ("moggie"), tortoiseshell

Flossie (born 29 December 1995) is a British domestic cat recognized by Guinness World Records as the oldest living cat (as of December 2025). Flossie lives in Orpington, England, with her owner Victoria Green.

== Life ==
=== Early life ===
Flossie was born on 29 December 1995. As a kitten, she lived in a feral cat colony near St Helens Hospital, Merseyside. Several staff who worked at the hospital adopted the kittens of the colony, including Flossie. Flossie lived with her first owner for ten years until their death, and was then adopted by their sister. The cat lived with the second owner for 14 years until her death.

Her son then decided to adopt Flossie. However, after three years he had to give up the cat, being unable to support her welfare, and she was taken in by Cats Protection.

=== Adoption ===
In 2022, Flossie was adopted by Victoria Green. Green at first thought that the advert posted online by Cats Protection was a mistake, because the age listed for Flossie was 27 years. Green lived in Orpington and had previous experience caring for senior cats. Flossie was deaf and had limited eyesight. After moving in with Green, she was initially disoriented due to her advanced ailments, but over time settled down and became comfortable living with Green.

=== Guinness World Records ===
Just before Flossie's 27th birthday, Guinness World Records officially recognized her as the oldest living cat, becoming an official world-record title holder. Despite Flossie's advanced age, she remains active and often will wake up early for breakfast, before napping and playing for most of the day. Flossie is the sixth oldest verified cat to have ever lived, behind Creme Puff, who lived to the age of 38 years, as well as Puss, Ma, Grandpa Rexs Allen and Kitty. Other cats have been claimed to have been older, but were not verified.

== See also ==
- Aging in cats
- List of longest-living cats
- List of individual cats
- Creme Puff – longest-lived cat
