= Hanako (fish) =

Scarlet koi fish (c. 1751–1977)

- Species: Koi
- Sex: Female
- Born: Purportedly c. 1751
- Died: July 7, 1977 (aged 225–226); Japan

Hanako (Japanese: 花子) (purportedly c. 1751 – July 7, 1977) was a scarlet koi fish reportedly owned by several individuals, the last of whom was Komei Koshihara. She was reported to be the longest-lived koi fish ever recorded, having died at the age of 226, although there is dispute as to the veracity of her longevity.

== Longevity ==
Most koi fish from Japan live around forty years. Far exceeding the average lifespan for koi, she was reportedly 226 years old at the time of her death. Her age was said to be determined in 1966 by removing two of her scales and examining them extensively. At this time, Hanako weighed 7.5 kg (17 lb) and measured 70 cm (28 in) in length. Once the scales were fully analyzed, it was determined that she was 215 years old. In July 1974, a study of the growth rings of one of the koi's scales reported that Hanako was 226 years old. She is reported to be the longest-lived koi fish ever recorded.

=== Veracity ===
Despite the claims of Hanako's long life, Snopes reported that no conclusive evidence of Hanako's age could be found. The story of Hanako dates back to a 1966 interview with Komei Koshihara, who stated that Hanako's age was determined by a scientist named Masayoshi Hiro at the Laboratory of Animal Science at the Nagoya Women's University, although Snopes was unable to find any peer-reviewed studies from Hiro regarding Hanako's age. Furthermore, Dave Catania from the California Academy of Sciences said that "using scales is the least accurate method of aging carp", and that a more accurate age could have been determined by extracting otoliths from Hanako after her death. National Geographic noted that Hanako's age may "just be a legend".

== See also ==
- List of longest-living organisms
- Brantevik Eel
- Methuselah (lungfish)
