= List of maximum animal lifespans in captivity =

Record lifespan in captive animals

This is a list of maximum recorded animal lifespans in captivity. Only animals from the classes of the Chordata phylum are included. On average, captive animals (especially mammals) live longer than wild animals. This may be due to the fact that with proper treatment, captivity can provide refuge against diseases, competition with others of the same species and predators. Most notably, animals with shorter lifespans and faster growth rates benefit more from zoos than animals with higher longevities and slow growth rates.

== Mammals ==
Family	Name	Binomial name	Image	Maximum lifespan
Elephantidae	Asian elephant	Elephas maximus	Elephas maximus (Bandipur)	88 years
Hominidae	Chimpanzee	Pan troglodytes	015 Chimpanzee at Kibale forest National Park Photo by Giles Laurent	79 years
Hominidae	Bonobo	Pan paniscus		70 years
Hominidae	Western gorilla	Gorilla gorilla		68 years
Elephantidae	African bush elephant	Loxodonta africana	African Bush Elephant	65 years
Hominidae	Sumatran orangutan	Pongo abelii		64 years
Hippopotamidae	Hippopotamus	Hippopotamus amphibius	Portrait Hippopotamus in the water	61.2 years
Delphinidae	Orca	Orcinus orca		60 years
Hylobatidae	Siamang	Symphalangus syndactylus		55 years
Choloepodidae	Linnaeus's two-toed sloth	Choloepus didactylus		54 years
Rhinocerotidae	White rhinoceros	Ceratotherium simum	White rhino looking up (7765537606)	45 years
Ursidae	Polar bear	Ursus maritimus		42 years
Ursidae	Grizzly bear	Ursus arctos horribilis	GrizzlyBearJeanBeaufort	40 years
Giraffidae	Giraffe	Giraffa camelopardalis	Giraffe Mikumi National Park	39.5 years
Lemuridae	Ring-tailed lemur	Lemur catta		39 years
Ursidae	Giant panda	Ailuropoda melanoleuca		38 years
Vombatidae	Common wombat	Vombatus ursinus		35 years
Bovidae	African buffalo	Syncerus caffer	African buffalo (Syncerus caffer caffer) male with cattle egret	32.8 years
Heterocephalidae	Naked mole-rat	Heterocephalus glaber		32 years
Camelidae	Dromedary camel	Camelus dromedarius	Camelus dromedarius on Sinai	28.4 years
Felidae	Jaguar	Panthera onca	Standing jaguar	28 years
Felidae	Lion	Panthera leo	Lion waiting in Namibia	28 years
Felidae	Cougar	Puma concolor	Mountain Lion in Glacier National Park	27 years
Cervidae	Fallow deer	Cervus dama	Dülmen, Wildpark -- 2018 -- 3762	27 years
Felidae	Tiger	Panthera tigris	Walking tiger female	26.3 years
Phascolarctidae	Koala	Phascolarctos cinereus		25 years
Bovidae	Blackbuck	Antilope cervicapra	Blackbuck male female	23.9 years
Castoridae	American beaver	Castor canadensis	American Beaver	23.4 years
Cervidae	Mule deer	Odocoileus hemionus	Mule buck elk creek m myatt (5489214303)	22 years
Canidae	Red fox	Vulpes vulpes	Vulpes vulpes ssp fulvus	21.3 years
Canidae	Grey wolf	Canis lupus	Eurasian wolf 2	20.6 years
Leporidae	European rabbit	Oryctolagus cuniculus		18.8 years
Mustelidae	Giant otter	Pteronura brasiliensis	Giant otters (Pteronura brasiliensis)	17.3 years
Bovidae	Pronghorn	Antilocapra americana	Antilocapra americana	15.5 years

== Birds ==
Family	Name	Binomial name	Image	Maximum lifespan
Phoenicopteridae	Greater flamingo	Phoenicopterus roseus		83 years
Cacatuidae	Pink cockatoo	Cacatua leadbeateri		82 years
Cathartidae	Andean condor	Vultur gryphus	AndeanCondorMale	80 years
Corvidae	Common raven	Corvus corax	Corvus corax.001 - Tower of London	69 years
Struthionidae	Ostrich	Struthio	Struthio Diversity	50 years
Accipitridae	Golden eagle	Aquila chrysaetos	Беркут (Aquila chrysaetos)	48 years
Anatidae	Canada goose	Branta canadensis	Canada goose on Seedskadee NWR (27826185489)	42 years
Columbidae	Rock dove	Columba livia	Paloma bravía (Columba livia), Palacio de Nymphenburg, Múnich, Alemania01	35 years

== Reptiles ==
Family	Name	Binomial name	Image	Maximum lifespan
Testudinidae	Aldabra giant tortoise	Aldabrachelys gigantea		194 years
Crocodylidae	Nile crocodile	Crocodylus niloticus	NileCrocodile	124 years
Alligatoridae	American alligator	Alligator mississippiensis	American Alligator	87 years
Iguanidae	Rhinoceros iguana	Cyclura cornuta		42.9 years
Boidae	Green anaconda	Eunectes murinus		42 years
Boidae	Boa constrictor	Boa constrictor	Boa constrictor, Vaňkovka, Brno (2)	40.4 years

== See also ==
- List of longest-living organisms
- Longevity
- Life expectancy
