= Brantevik Eel =

Eel believed to have lived over 150 years

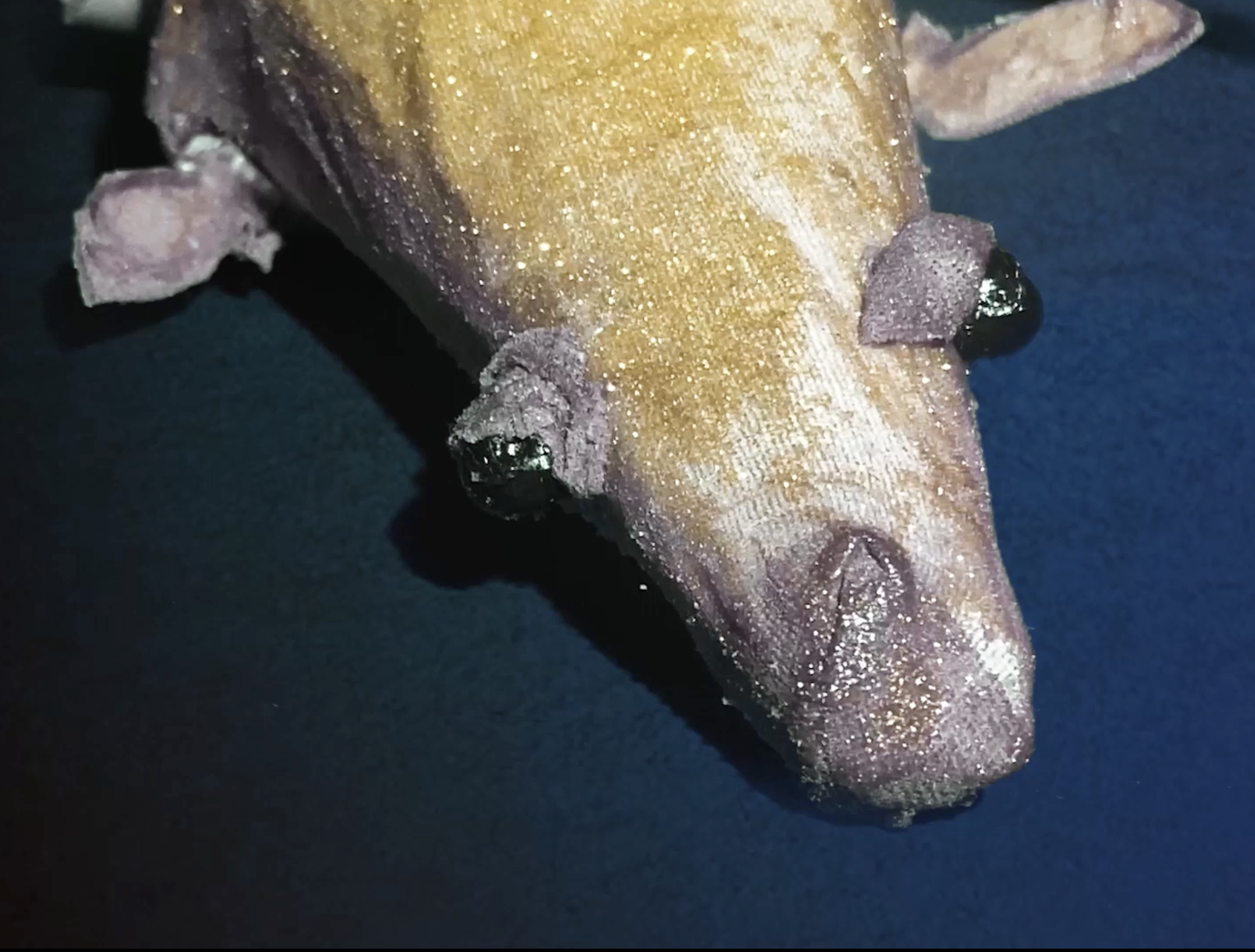
- A puppeteer's interpretation
- Other name: Åle
- Species: Anguilla anguilla (European eel)
- Sex: Male
- Born: Sargasso Sea
- Died: 2014 (155 years); Brantevik, Sweden
- Cause of death: Hyperthermia (alleged)
- Years active: 1859–2014
- Known for: Longevity
- Owners: Samuel Nillson, Thomas Kjellman

The Brantevik Eel (Swedish: Branteviksålen) (before 1859 – before 7 August 2014), also known as Åle, was a European eel (Anguilla anguilla) that is believed to have lived for more than 150 years.

The eel was released into a well in the village of Brantevik, Sweden in 1859 by an eight-year-old boy, Samuel Nilsson. On 7 August 2014, Tomas Kjellman, the owner of the property, reported that the eel was found dead and partially decomposed. The eel was sent to an expert to determine the eel's age.

The eel's head, presumed lost, was eventually recovered in a freezer. SVT's nature show Mitt i naturen extracted the eel from the well at one point, but put it back.

== Life ==
In the wild, American and European eels originate exclusively from the Sargasso Sea at the Mid-Atlantic Ridge. During their juvenile stages as glass eels and leptocephali, these eels will travel to both Europe and North America to find freshwater, where they will spend the majority of their lives. It is presumed that Åle traveled from the Sargasso sea to Brantevik prior to his capture.

At the time of his capture, it was not uncommon to throw an eel into a well. Due to the lack of quality water treatment in 19th-century Sweden, eels could be a satisfactory method to manage watery pests. Åle is alleged to have survived by eating mosquitoes and similar insects.

Samuel Nillson and his family dubbed the eel "Åle". The name is derived from the word "ål", or "eel" in Swedish. In 1904, an unnamed female eel was thrown into the well. As late as 2023, the female eel was confirmed to be alive in the same well that Åle had perished in.

== Physical attributes ==
The average lifespan of a European eel is up to 20 years, making the alleged age of the Brantevik eel a notable deviation. Due to his time in the darkness, it is reported that his eyes were far larger than a typical eel. It is also reported that Åle would change from silver to gold during mating periods, but due to his captivity, his scales would return to silver after a period of time.

In 2009, the Swedish television series Mitt i naturen reported that the eel was 53 centimetres in length.

== Speculation ==
Both European and American eels (Anguilla rostrata) participate in natal homing at the end of their lives. During this process, both species of eel will return to the Sargasso Sea to complete their life cycle. Since Åle's well lacked proper egress, it is speculated that his inability to complete this cycle is the reason he did not die.

Some critics are skeptical of Åle's longevity. Other eels with similar stories, however, give the story potential credibility. For example, an eel called Pute lived in a Swedish aquarium until he was 85 years old. Another eel in Denmark may have lived to be 55 years old. Eels within the same genus, such as the New Zealand longfin eel (Anguilla dieffenbachii), can live to 100 years of age.

== Death ==
While hosting a traditional crayfish party in 2014, the well's owner invited his guests to view the famous eel. Upon lifting the cover, however, it was found that Åle may have overheated and had partially decomposed. At the time of death, it was recorded that Åle had lived for 155 years.

Despite his longevity, it is believed that Åle did not die from old age, but instead from overheating on a hot summer day.

With proper analysis, the age of an eel can be determined by its otolith, a bone-like structure within the inner ear. This part of the ear retains ridges similar to the rings of a tree, making it a reliable way to quantify the age of some marine vertebrae. After his death, Åle's remains were transported for analysis.

Following Åle's death, Swedish citizens took to Twitter with the hashtag "#RIPalen", which translates to "Rip Åle/Eel". They acknowledged Åle's passing by tweeting various puns with the Swedish word "ål".

== See also ==
- List of longest-living organisms
- Methuselah (lungfish)
- Hanako (fish)
