= Methuselah (lungfish) =

Oldest living aquarium fish

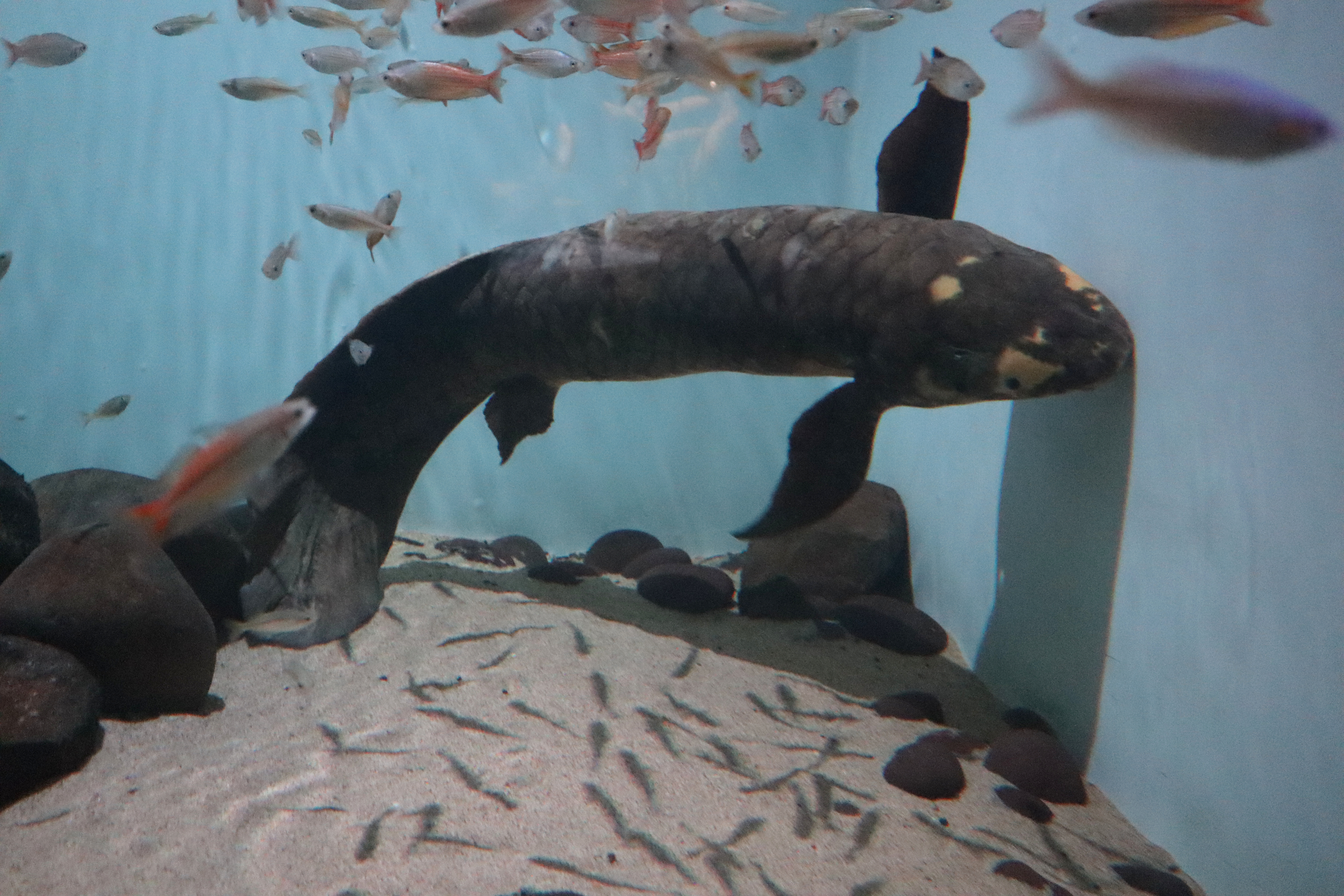
- Methuselah in 2025
- Species: Neoceratodus forsteri
- Sex: Unknown; suspected female
- Born: Per DNA study: 1922 to 1931; Per earlier aquarium estimate: c. 1938
- Known for: Oldest living fish in captivity
- Residence: Steinhart Aquarium, San Francisco

Methuselah (captured 1938; born as early as 1922) is an Australian lungfish residing at the Steinhart Aquarium. She is known for being the oldest living fish in captivity as of 2026.

== Life ==
Methuselah arrived at San Francisco's Steinhart Aquarium on November 6, 1938. She was transported from Melbourne, Australia, in the cargo hull of a Matson liner steamship, alongside 231 other fish from Australia and Fiji. At the time of her arrival, she was already grown and estimated to be at least 7 years old. She was first mentioned in the San Francisco Chronicle in 1947. She was joined by another lungfish, named after Herb Caen, in 1952 or 1958.

She was given the name Methuselah by Steinhart Aquarium director John McCosker in 1988 after spending 50 years at the aquarium. Due to damage incurred in the 1989 Loma Prieta earthquake, the original Steinhart Aquarium was torn down in 2005. Along with the aquarium's other lungfish, Methuselah was moved to a temporary home on Howard Street until a new aquarium building was opened in 2008. During her stay at the temporary home, Methuselah jumped out of her tank and stayed outside for an hour before being discovered, leading to a nylon jump guard being installed at the top of the tank.

== Age ==
In 2017, Methuselah was unofficially designated as the oldest living aquarium fish following the death of Granddad, another Australian lungfish residing at Shedd Aquarium in Chicago, then estimated to be 95 years old. A later study estimated Granddad to have been 109 years old at the time of his death.

Genetic testing was performed on Methuselah in 2023 to estimate her age by measuring DNA methylation from a sample of her fins. The study estimated her to be between 92 and 101 years old at the time, far upwards of her previously estimated age of 84. By comparison, the aquarium's two other lungfish were found to be 54 and 50 years old. While similar in appearance to them, Methuselah has developed a comparatively lighter coloration over time, which is likely a result of aging.

== Description ==
Methuselah measures 4 feet (1.2 m) in length and weighs 40 pounds (18 kg) as of 2022. As Australian lungfish are not sexually dimorphic, Methuselah's biological sex has not been determined with certainty. She is suspected to be female based on behavioral cues. Methuselah's personality has been described as "mellow" by her handler. She was also noted to like belly and back rubs, as well as fresh figs.

== See also ==
- List of longest-living organisms
- Brantevik Eel
- Hanako (fish)
