= Cocky Bennett =

Sulphur-crested cockatoo (1796–1916)

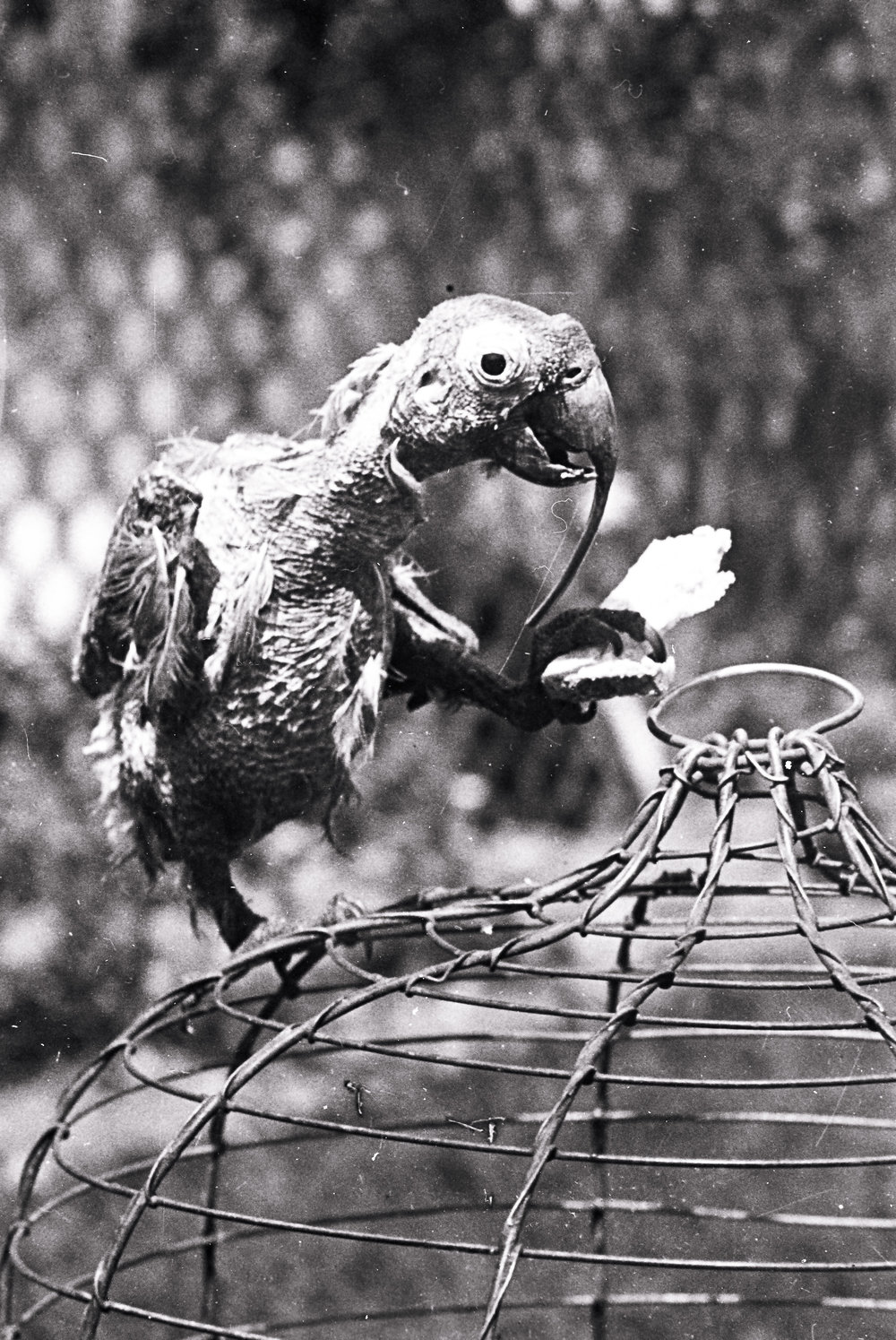
- Cocky Bennett at the Sea Breeze Hotel, Tom Ugly's Point, aged 118 in 1914
- Species: Cacatua galerita
- Sex: Male
- Born: 1796
- Died: 26 May 1916 (aged c. 119–120); Canterbury, New South Wales
- Known for: Oldest parrot in history (claimed)

Cocky Bennett (1796 – 26 May 1916) was an Australian Sulphur-crested cockatoo (Cacatua galerita) reported to have lived for about 119 to 120 years, making him one of the oldest parrots ever recorded. Renowned throughout the late 19th and early 20th centuries, Bennett became a well-known fixture at the Sea Breeze Hotel in Blakehurst, New South Wales, where he greeted patrons, mimicked human speech, and entertained guests.

== Life ==
Bennett spent the first 78 years of his life travelling extensively with his owner, Captain Ellis, who operated a trading vessel in the South Sea Islands. During this period, Bennett was reputed to have accompanied Ellis on numerous voyages around the world. Captain Ellis died in the Solomon Islands at the age of 87, having reportedly circumnavigated the globe several times with the bird.

Following Ellis's death, Cocky came under the temporary care of the captain's nephew, though ownership had been formally bequeathed to Joseph and Sarah Bowden, who at the time were likely the licensees of Bowden's Clubhouse, located near the corner of Hunter and Castlereagh Streets in Sydney.

By the time the Bowdens received the bird, they had relocated to Melbourne. After Joseph Bowden's death in 1889, Sarah Bowden married Charles Bennett, and the couple subsequently moved to Tom Ugly's Point in Blakehurst, New South Wales, where Charles became the licensee of the Sea Breeze Hotel.

== Death ==
Cocky Bennett died on 26 May 1916 at Canterbury, New South Wales, at an age reported to be approximately 119–120 years.

== See also ==
- List of long-living organisms
