= Debby (polar bear) =

Longest-lived known polar bear

- Debby in 2008
- Species: Polar bear
- Sex: Female
- Born: c. 1966; Soviet Union
- Died: 17 November 2008 (aged 41–42); Winnipeg, Manitoba, Canada
- Known for: Oldest polar bear recorded
- Residence: Assiniboine Park Zoo

Debby (1966 – November 17, 2008) was a female polar bear, considered by scholars as the world's oldest. She lived in the Assiniboine Park Zoo in Winnipeg.

Debby was born in the Soviet Arctic in 1966, and subsequently orphaned; she arrived in Winnipeg when she was a year old with another polar bear cub, Dennis, who was later sent to the Calgary Zoo.

While in captivity, she had six cubs with her mate Skipper. As of her death, all six of them were still living. She was described as "the most popular animal in the zoo's history". She liked to swim and play in the pond in her habitat, and her keepers said that "her favourite pastimes remains eating". Some of her favorite treats included veggie dogs and smoked goldeye. While healthy, she weighed over 300 kilograms (660 lb).

In August 2008, the Guinness World Records certified her as not only the oldest polar bear when she turned 41 years old, but one of the three oldest individuals ever recorded of all eight bear species. Robert E. Wrigley, the zoo's curator, believed that she managed to live such a long life due "exceptional genetic inheritance, high-quality diet, daily activity, and special care from her keepers", and reported that over most of her life she had needed only three relatively minor medical procedures. She inspired Wrigley's book Polar Bear encounters at Churchill, as well as two children's books.

In November 2008, she was found to have multiple organ dysfunction syndrome, and was subsequently euthanized after she stopped eating and found it difficult to get up. She was 41 years old, and had had several strokes and other age-related medical issues in the years leading up to her death.

After her death, the zoo held a memorial, which featured a smudging ceremony and songs and speeches in Debby's honor. Later, a statue of Debby by Charles Johnston was put up in Assiniboine Park Zoo. The statue contained some of her ashes. Debby was the Assiniboine Park Zoo's last polar bear at the time. It did not immediately get a new polar bear after her death, since the enclosure in which she had lived since her arrival in 1967, which was state-of-the-art when built in 1958, no longer met Manitoba's standards for keeping polar bears. Her enclosure was concrete, without any soft ground, and was too small and had too small of a pool. After opening a new Polar Bear Conservation Center, the zoo got a new polar bear named Hudson in 2013.

== See also ==
- List of individual bears
