= Aging in cats =

Aging in cats is the process by which cats change over the course of their natural lifespans. The normal lifespan of domestic cats is in the range of 13 to 20 years. This process, and different signs will vary from cat to cat depending on different factors such as breed. Signs of aging may not be predictable but affects all parts of the body, from head to paw, with first signs commonly going unnoticed.

== Average lifespan among domestic cats ==
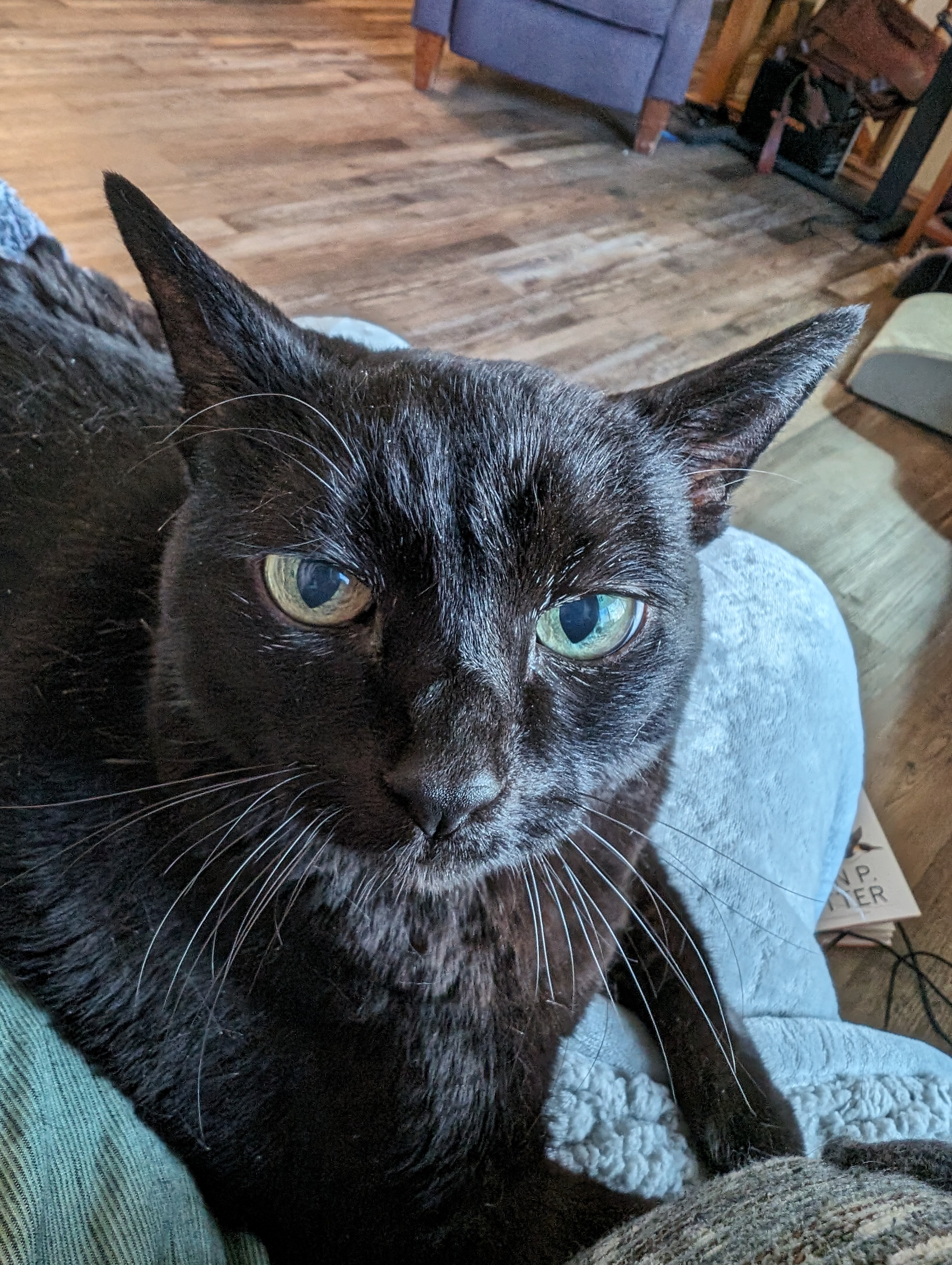
This cat is around 18 years old; notably, there are specks of grey fur around the eyes.

Reliable information on the lifespans of domestic cats is varied and limited. Nevertheless, a number of studies have investigated the matter and have come up with noteworthy estimates. Estimates of mean lifespan in these studies range between 13 and 20 years, with a single value in the neighborhood of 15 years. At least one study found a median lifespan value of 14 years and a corresponding interquartile range of 9 to 17 years. Maximum lifespan has been estimated at values ranging from 22 to 30 years although there have been claims of cats living longer than 30 years. According to the 2010 edition of the Guinness World Records, the oldest cat ever recorded was Creme Puff, who died in 2005, aged 38 years, 3 days. Female cats typically outlive male cats, and crossbred cats typically outlive purebred cats. It has also been found that the greater a cat's weight, the lower its life expectancy on average. As of December 2025, the oldest verified cat alive is Flossie, who was born in 1995 in the United Kingdom.

In one study of cat mortality, the most frequent causes were trauma (12.2%), renal disorder (12.1%), non-specific illness (11.2%), neoplasia (10.8%) and mass lesion disorders (10.2%).

== Signs of aging ==
=== Loss of senses ===
As a cat ages, it is typical for them to lose the ability to use their senses as they once did. Their sense of smell could decrease as well as their ability to see. They also could have significant hearing loss, which can cause confusion and a change in their vocalizations.

=== Fur ===
Fur can become less shiny, duller, and greasier. They may start to get white/grey fur around their nose, above their upper lip, and in some cases on their back. This change in color can be due to multiple different reasons, such as cell hypoxia, hormone changes, and meal changes.

=== Weight loss ===
Weight loss is common: starting about 2–3 years before a cat dies, they may start to lose muscle and lean tissue. Weighing cats as they go to the vet is important, so that way their weight can be monitored to predict when aging is starting to take its toll on the animal. One reason for this loss in weight is that, as cats get older, they begin to move around less, so they do not need to eat as many calories in a day to sustain themselves. Their bodies will also have a harder time digesting food, so they may experience less fat and protein intake from their meals.

=== Diseases ===
Aging cats could have dental disease and the pain caused by this may not stop a cat from eating, but it will prevent the amount that they eat; which contributes to loss in weight. They may begin to lose their teeth if they aren't properly taken care of, as well as having gum disease.

Other diseases found in cats: chronic renal disease, hyperthyroidism, diabetes mellitus.

=== Arthritis ===
Arthritis occurs in the elbows, spines, and shoulders of cats, causing moderate to extreme discomfort. This discomfort can lead to less food intake, so it is important that a cat with arthritis has raised bowls and water dishes.

=== Nails ===
Nails become brittle and deformed.

=== Skin ===
Most older cats will get dehydrated skin because they begin to drink and eat less. Flaky skin is also caused when a cat begins to groom less, which is also another cause for oily fur (see Fur).
