= Eucalyptus recurva =

Mongarlowe mallee

Conservation status
- Critically Endangered (IUCN 3.1)

Scientific classification
- Kingdom: Plantae
- Clade: Tracheophytes
- Clade: Angiosperms
- Clade: Eudicots
- Clade: Rosids
- Order: Myrtales
- Family: Myrtaceae
- Genus: Eucalyptus
- Species: E. recurva

Binomial name
- Eucalyptus recurva Crisp

Species of eucalyptus

Eucalyptus recurva, commonly known as Mongarlowe mallee, is a species of dense mallee shrub that is endemic to a small area of New South Wales. It has smooth bark, a crown consisting of unusually small, juvenile leaves, flower buds in groups of three, white flowers and hemispherical fruit. It is only known from six extremely old multi-stemmed individual plants and is classed as "critically endangered".

== Description ==
Eucalyptus recurva is a mallee that typically grows to a height of 1.5–4.2 m (4 ft 11 in – 13 ft 9 in) and forms a lignotuber. It has smooth grey, orange, green or yellow bark that is shed in long ribbons. Young plants and coppice regrowth have sessile, elliptical to egg-shaped leaves that are arranged in opposite pairs, each leaf 10–20 mm (0.39–0.79 in) long and 4–8 mm (0.16–0.31 in) wide. The crown of mature trees is composed of juvenile leaves that are paler on the lower surface, up to 32 mm (1.3 in) long and 4–8 mm (0.16–0.31 in) wide with the tip turned down. The flower buds are arranged in leaf axils in groups of three on an unbranched peduncle 3–5 mm (0.12–0.20 in) long, the individual buds sessile or on very short pedicels. Mature buds are broadly oval and wrinkled, 4–5 mm (0.16–0.20 in) long and 3–4 mm (0.12–0.16 in) wide with a rounded operculum that is shorter and narrower than the floral cup at the join. Flowering occurs in a short period in January and the flowers are white. The fruit is a woody, hemispherical capsule 3–4 mm (0.12–0.16 in) long and 4–5 mm (0.16–0.20 in) wide with the valves protruding.

The remaining wild specimens are thought to be extremely old. Based on the size of its lignotuber, the largest single specimen is estimated to be 3,000 years old, given that its lignotuber grows at only 2mm per year. However, it is possible that two other specimens are actually the result of a split in the original rootstock, and based on their spread of 26m would be estimated at 13,000 years old, which if correct would make it the oldest single tree known to be alive on earth.

== Taxonomy and naming ==
Eucalyptus recurva was first formally described in 1988 by Michael Crisp from material collected near Braidwood. The species was discovered by "Ms. R. Jean, a landholder from near Braidwood" who first brought specimens to the Australian National Botanic Gardens in August 1985. The specific epithet (recurva) is a Latin word meaning "curved backwards", referring to the conspicuously recurved leaves of this mallee.

== Distribution and habitat ==
Mongarlowe mallee is found on sloping sites in low heathland and at the margins of the heathland and low woodland. It is only known from six individual plants growing at four sites near Mongarlowe and Windellama.

== Conservation status ==
Natural regeneration is not known. Little success has been recorded in the growth of seedlings, which often lack vigour and soon die. However, the species is not considered sterile. This mallee is classed as "critically endangered" under the Australian Government Environment Protection and Biodiversity Conservation Act 1999 and the New South Wales Government Threatened Species Conservation Act 1995. The main threat to the species is visitation pressure, including collection of plant material, soil compaction and damage by vehicles.

== External sources ==
- World Conservation Monitoring Centre (1998). "Eucalyptus recurva". IUCN Red List of Threatened Species. 1998 e.T34924A9898018. doi:10.2305/IUCN.UK.1998.RLTS.T34924A9898018.en.
