= Back Creek, New South Wales (Queanbeyan–Palerang) =

Back Creek New South Wales
- Coordinates: 35°20′49″S 149°56′13″E
- Population: 7 (2021 census)
- Postcode(s): 2622
- Time zone: AEST (UTC+10)
  - Summer (DST): AEDT (UTC+11)
- LGA(s): Queanbeyan–Palerang Regional Council
- Region: Southern Tablelands
- State electorate(s): Monaro
- Federal division(s): Eden-Monaro

Back Creek is a small rural locality in the Queanbeyan–Palerang Regional Council, part of the Southern Tablelands region of New South Wales, Australia.

The area now known as Back Creek lies on the traditional lands of Walbanga people, a group of Yuin.

The locality takes its name from the watercourse Back Creek, a left-bank tributary of Mongarlowe River.

At the 2021 census, the town recorded a population of 7.
