= Creme Puff (cat) =

Oldest known cat <<unverified>> (1967–2005)

- Creme Puff in 1996 (age 29)
- Other name: Crème Puff
- Species: Felis catus
- Sex: Female
- Born: August 3, 1967; Austin, Texas, U.S.
- Died: August 6, 2005 (aged 38); Austin, Texas, U.S.
- Known for: Longest lived cat certified by Guinness World Records
- Owner: Jake Perry

Creme Puff (August 3, 1967 – August 6, 2005) was a mixed tabby domestic cat, owned by Jake Perry of Austin, Texas. She was the oldest cat ever recorded, according to the 2010 edition of Guinness World Records, when she died at the age of 38 years and 3 days.

Perry had another cat, Grandpa Rexs Allen, who is the fourth-oldest cat ever recorded. Perry said Grandpa was born in Paris, France, on February 1, 1964, and died aged 34 years and 59 days on April 1, 1998. Grandpa was posthumously awarded 1999 Cat of the Year by Cats & Kittens magazine.

Jake Perry has owned many cats and almost all have lived past their 30's.

== Lifestyle ==
Creme Puff's owner, Jake Perry, said her diet consisted of dry cat food and claimed he supplemented it with broccoli, eggs, turkey bacon, coffee with cream, and every two days "an eyedropper full of red wine." Perry claimed that this diet was key to her longevity, and that the wine "circulated the arteries." Coffee and alcohol are generally understood to be toxic to cats, however.

Perry turned his garage into a movie theater that played nature documentaries. He installed steps onto his walls for the cats to climb and built a screened enclosure in his backyard to allow the pets to enjoy the outdoors.

== See also ==
- Aging in cats
- Bobi – allegedly the longest-lived dog
- Flossie – the oldest verified currently-living cat (as of January 2026)
- List of individual cats
- List of longest-living cats
