= Mongarlowe River =

Mongarlowe River Little River
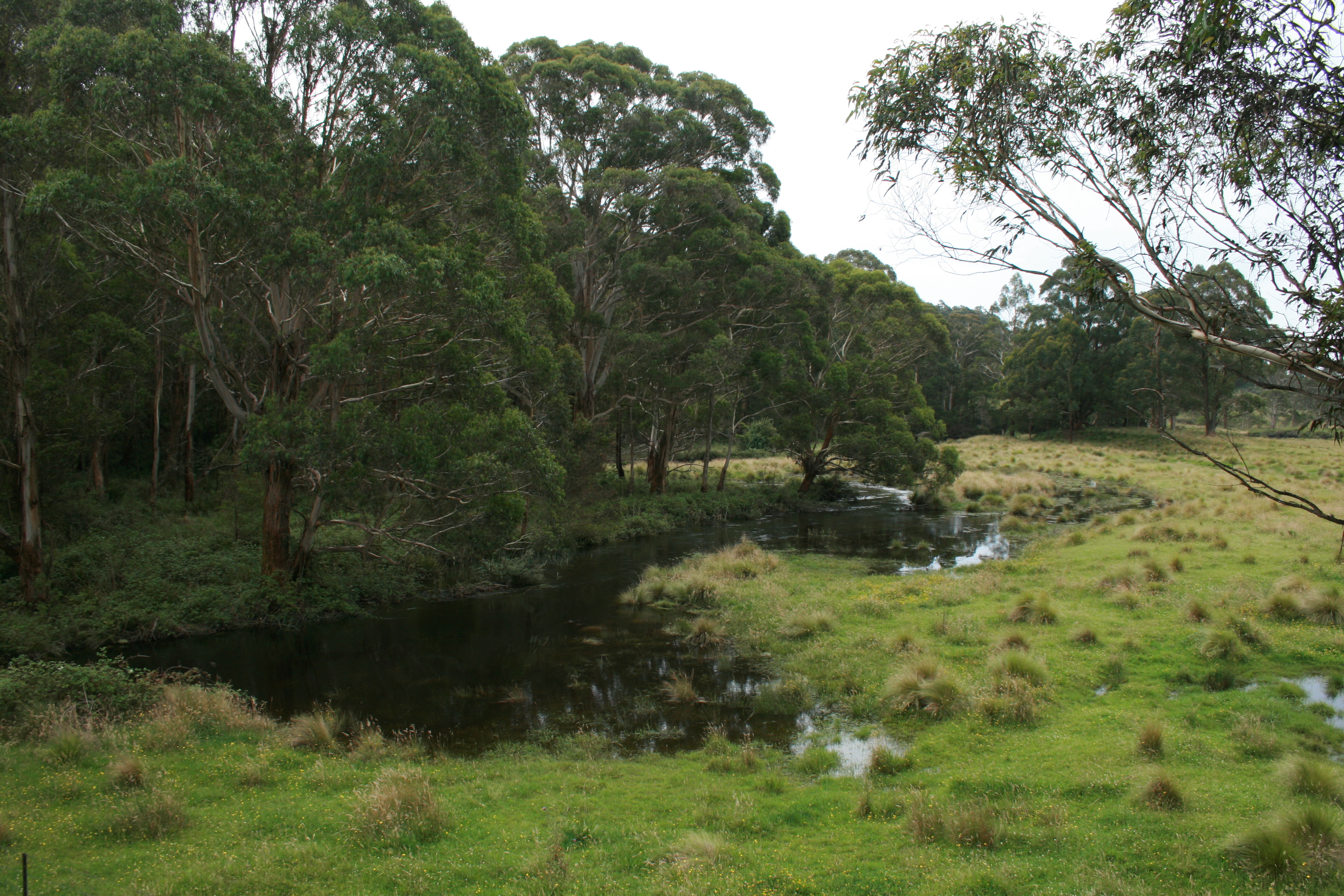

Location
- Country: Australia
- State: New South Wales
- Region: Sydney Basin (IBRA), Southern Tablelands
- Local government area: Queanbeyan-Palerang

Physical characteristics
- Source: Great Dividing Range
  - location: southeast of Araluen
  - coordinates: 35°39′11″S 149°54′36″E
  - elevation: 796 m (2,612 ft)
- Mouth: Shoalhaven River
  - location: near Charleyong
  - coordinates: 35°14′56″S 149°53′33″E
  - elevation: 556 m (1,824 ft)
- Length: 72 km (45 mi)

Basin features
- River system: Shoalhaven River
- Tributaries
  - left: Northangera Creek, Warrambucca Creek, Tantulean Creek, Cookanulla Creek
  - right: Feagans Creek, Nettletons Creek
- National park: Monga

The Mongarlowe River is a perennial river of the Shoalhaven catchment located in the Southern Tablelands region of New South Wales, Australia. It was also known as Little River, during the 19th century.

== Location and features ==
The river rises on the western slopes of the Great Dividing Range within the Monga National Park about 6.5 kilometres (4.0 mi) east southeast of the village of Araluen. The river flows generally north, joined by six minor tributaries before reaching its confluence with the Shoalhaven River approximately 3 kilometres (1.9 mi) northwest of the locality of Charleyong. The river descends 242 metres (794 ft) over its 72-kilometre (45 mi) course.

The river is crossed by the Kings Highway northwest of Clyde Mountain. There are other road crossings at Monga, Mongarlowe and Marlowe.

The river has a translocated population of the endangered Macquarie perch (Macquaria australasica). It is thought that this population descends from fish from the Murray-Darling Basin and not the eastern sub-species native to other parts of the Shoalhaven catchment. In recent years, this population seems to be in decline and may be doomed to local extinction.

== See also ==
- List of rivers of Australia § New South Wales
- List of rivers in New South Wales (L-Z)
- Rivers of New South Wales
