= List of Spanish provinces by life expectancy =

Development of life expectancy in Spain from 1908 to 2023. The sharp decline in life expectancy in 1918 was due to the Great Influenza epidemic.

Spain is administratively divided into 17 autonomous communities. Autonomous communities, in turn, are divided into provinces — there are 50 of them, plus two autonomous cities in Africa (Ceuta and Melilla).

According to estimation of the Spanish National Statistics Institute (INE), life expectancy at birth in the country in 2023 was 83.77 years (81.11 years for male and 86.34 years for female).

According to alternative estimation of the United Nations, in 2023 life expectancy in Spain was 83.67 years total (80.96 for male, 86.31 for female).

Estimation of the World Bank Group for 2023: 83.88 years total (81.20 for male, 86.70 for female).

Estimation of Eurostat for 2023: 84.0 years total (81.3 for male, 86.7 for female).

According to estimation of the WHO for 2019, at that year life expectancy in Spain was 83.14 years (80.54 years for male and 85.66 years for female).
And healthy life expectancy was 71.69 years (70.90 years for male and 72.42 years for female).

According to estimation of Eurostat for 2023, some regions of Spain are among the leaders in Europe in life expectancy. This list of regions is topped by the Community of Madrid, with an overall life expectancy estimated at 86.1 years.

In 2023, the difference in life expectancy between the most prosperous and disadvantaged provinces of Spain (excluding autonomous cities) was 3.59 years.
In 2022, this difference was 3.45 years.
In pre-COVID 2019, this difference was 3.22 years.

== National Statistics Institute (2024) ==
=== Statistics by province ===
| province | 2024 | | | | historical data | | | | | | | | | | | | | |
| province | overall | male | female | sex gap | 2014 | 2014 →2019 | 2019 | 2019 →2020 | 2020 | 2020 →2021 | 2021 | 2021 →2022 | 2022 | 2022 →2023 | 2023 | 2023 →2024 | 2024 | 2014 →2024 |
|---|---|---|---|---|---|---|---|---|---|---|---|---|---|---|---|---|---|---|
| Spain on average | 84.01 | 81.38 | 86.53 | 5.15 | 82.91 | 0.62 | 83.53 | −1.25 | 82.28 | 0.75 | 83.03 | 0.05 | 83.08 | 0.69 | 83.77 | 0.24 | 84.01 | 1.10 |
| Salamanca | 85.77 | 83.46 | 87.99 | 4.53 | 84.58 | 0.11 | 84.69 | −2.16 | 82.53 | 2.20 | 84.73 | −0.61 | 84.12 | 1.28 | 85.40 | 0.37 | 85.77 | 1.19 |
| Madrid | 85.58 | 83.07 | 87.74 | 4.67 | 84.20 | 0.73 | 84.93 | −2.66 | 82.27 | 2.29 | 84.56 | 0.20 | 84.76 | 0.63 | 85.39 | 0.19 | 85.58 | 1.38 |
| Segovia | 85.30 | 82.78 | 87.84 | 5.06 | 84.09 | 0.61 | 84.70 | −3.21 | 81.49 | 2.57 | 84.06 | 0.35 | 84.41 | −0.49 | 83.92 | 1.38 | 85.30 | 1.21 |
| Valladolid | 85.02 | 82.48 | 87.45 | 4.97 | 83.86 | 0.76 | 84.62 | −1.70 | 82.92 | 1.04 | 83.96 | 0.13 | 84.09 | 0.63 | 84.72 | 0.30 | 85.02 | 1.16 |
| Álava (Araba) | 85.02 | 82.43 | 87.54 | 5.11 | 84.38 | 0.38 | 84.76 | −1.17 | 83.59 | 0.72 | 84.31 | −0.18 | 84.13 | 0.94 | 85.07 | −0.05 | 85.02 | 0.64 |
| Navarre | 84.66 | 81.96 | 87.33 | 5.37 | 83.45 | 1.10 | 84.55 | −1.22 | 83.33 | 0.93 | 84.26 | −0.41 | 83.85 | 0.94 | 84.79 | −0.13 | 84.66 | 1.21 |
| Biscay | 84.64 | 81.95 | 87.11 | 5.16 | 83.10 | 0.55 | 83.65 | −0.66 | 82.99 | 0.71 | 83.70 | −0.31 | 83.39 | 1.03 | 84.42 | 0.22 | 84.64 | 1.54 |
| Guadalajara | 84.56 | 82.53 | 86.67 | 4.14 | 84.36 | 0.37 | 84.73 | −2.44 | 82.29 | 1.57 | 83.86 | −0.14 | 83.72 | 0.99 | 84.71 | −0.15 | 84.56 | 0.20 |
| Burgos | 84.56 | 81.94 | 87.30 | 5.36 | 83.60 | 0.92 | 84.52 | −1.34 | 83.18 | 1.37 | 84.55 | −0.68 | 83.87 | 0.36 | 84.23 | 0.33 | 84.56 | 0.96 |
| Zamora | 84.50 | 81.94 | 87.19 | 5.25 | 83.41 | 0.01 | 83.42 | −0.52 | 82.90 | 1.25 | 84.15 | −0.53 | 83.62 | 1.53 | 85.15 | −0.65 | 84.50 | 1.09 |
| Soria | 84.49 | 82.50 | 86.60 | 4.10 | 84.02 | 0.46 | 84.48 | −2.22 | 82.26 | 1.37 | 83.63 | −0.34 | 83.29 | 1.44 | 84.73 | −0.24 | 84.49 | 0.47 |
| Gipuzkoa | 84.49 | 81.64 | 87.24 | 5.60 | 83.30 | 0.87 | 84.17 | −0.84 | 83.33 | 0.14 | 83.47 | −0.08 | 83.39 | 0.76 | 84.15 | 0.34 | 84.49 | 1.19 |
| Ávila | 84.45 | 81.99 | 87.12 | 5.13 | 83.15 | 0.80 | 83.95 | −1.71 | 82.24 | 1.33 | 83.57 | −0.16 | 83.41 | 1.00 | 84.41 | 0.04 | 84.45 | 1.30 |
| Barcelona | 84.45 | 81.84 | 86.84 | 5.00 | 83.27 | 0.74 | 84.01 | −1.79 | 82.22 | 1.26 | 83.48 | 0.21 | 83.69 | 0.46 | 84.15 | 0.30 | 84.45 | 1.18 |
| Toledo | 84.34 | 81.89 | 86.85 | 4.96 | 83.80 | −0.01 | 83.79 | −2.23 | 81.56 | 1.40 | 82.96 | 0.81 | 83.77 | 0.52 | 84.29 | 0.05 | 84.34 | 0.54 |
| Zaragoza | 84.33 | 81.69 | 86.84 | 5.15 | 82.71 | 1.07 | 83.78 | −1.56 | 82.22 | 0.86 | 83.08 | −0.01 | 83.07 | 0.90 | 83.97 | 0.36 | 84.33 | 1.62 |
| Pontevedra | 84.13 | 81.27 | 86.84 | 5.57 | 83.07 | 0.52 | 83.59 | −0.19 | 83.40 | 0.25 | 83.65 | −0.39 | 83.26 | 0.36 | 83.62 | 0.51 | 84.13 | 1.06 |
| A Coruña | 84.10 | 81.17 | 86.88 | 5.71 | 82.62 | 0.73 | 83.35 | 0.08 | 83.43 | −0.29 | 83.14 | −0.03 | 83.11 | 0.61 | 83.72 | 0.38 | 84.10 | 1.48 |
| Huesca | 84.07 | 81.81 | 86.44 | 4.63 | 83.25 | 0.89 | 84.14 | −1.22 | 82.92 | 0.77 | 83.69 | −0.75 | 82.94 | 1.47 | 84.41 | −0.34 | 84.07 | 0.82 |
| Lugo | 83.98 | 81.15 | 86.90 | 5.75 | 82.66 | 1.05 | 83.71 | −0.61 | 83.10 | 0.28 | 83.38 | −0.15 | 83.23 | 0.15 | 83.38 | 0.60 | 83.98 | 1.32 |
| Lleida | 83.94 | 81.32 | 86.67 | 5.35 | 82.92 | 0.61 | 83.53 | −1.25 | 82.28 | 0.48 | 82.76 | 0.25 | 83.01 | 0.64 | 83.65 | 0.29 | 83.94 | 1.02 |
| Teruel | 83.90 | 81.60 | 86.44 | 4.84 | 83.13 | 1.07 | 84.20 | −1.55 | 82.65 | 1.04 | 83.69 | −0.55 | 83.14 | 1.03 | 84.17 | −0.27 | 83.90 | 0.77 |
| La Rioja | 83.90 | 81.30 | 86.51 | 5.21 | 83.78 | 0.05 | 83.83 | −1.33 | 82.50 | 0.77 | 83.27 | −0.07 | 83.20 | 0.97 | 84.17 | −0.27 | 83.90 | 0.12 |
| León | 83.90 | 81.01 | 86.81 | 5.80 | 83.12 | 0.50 | 83.62 | −1.14 | 82.48 | 1.01 | 83.49 | −0.20 | 83.29 | 0.91 | 84.20 | −0.30 | 83.90 | 0.78 |
| Cantabria | 83.89 | 81.01 | 86.62 | 5.61 | 82.78 | 0.80 | 83.58 | −0.58 | 83.00 | 0.63 | 83.63 | −0.57 | 83.06 | 1.14 | 84.20 | −0.31 | 83.89 | 1.11 |
| Ourense | 83.88 | 81.18 | 86.55 | 5.37 | 83.66 | −0.09 | 83.57 | −0.51 | 83.06 | 0.46 | 83.52 | 0.06 | 83.58 | −0.07 | 83.51 | 0.37 | 83.88 | 0.22 |
| Girona | 83.83 | 81.20 | 86.47 | 5.27 | 82.86 | 0.29 | 83.15 | −0.52 | 82.63 | 0.39 | 83.02 | 0.00 | 83.02 | 0.48 | 83.50 | 0.33 | 83.83 | 0.97 |
| Palencia | 83.74 | 80.91 | 86.74 | 5.83 | 82.18 | 1.12 | 83.30 | −2.13 | 81.17 | 1.31 | 82.48 | −0.21 | 82.27 | 1.77 | 84.04 | −0.30 | 83.74 | 1.56 |
| Cuenca | 83.70 | 81.16 | 86.41 | 5.25 | 83.37 | 0.25 | 83.62 | −2.84 | 80.78 | 2.58 | 83.36 | −0.27 | 83.09 | 0.21 | 83.30 | 0.40 | 83.70 | 0.33 |
| Albacete | 83.66 | 81.10 | 86.28 | 5.18 | 82.66 | 0.65 | 83.31 | −1.95 | 81.36 | 1.85 | 83.21 | −0.22 | 82.99 | 0.62 | 83.61 | 0.05 | 83.66 | 1.00 |
| Cáceres | 83.62 | 80.87 | 86.49 | 5.62 | 83.21 | 0.26 | 83.47 | −1.75 | 81.72 | 0.90 | 82.62 | −0.09 | 82.53 | 0.75 | 83.28 | 0.34 | 83.62 | 0.41 |
| Alicante (Alacant) | 83.61 | 81.18 | 86.02 | 4.84 | 82.66 | 0.43 | 83.09 | −0.67 | 82.42 | −0.21 | 82.21 | 0.41 | 82.62 | 0.59 | 83.21 | 0.40 | 83.61 | 0.95 |
| Balearic Islands | 83.46 | 81.06 | 85.81 | 4.75 | 82.60 | 0.80 | 83.40 | −0.29 | 83.11 | −0.11 | 83.00 | −0.10 | 82.90 | 0.81 | 83.71 | −0.25 | 83.46 | 0.86 |
| Granada | 83.42 | 80.83 | 85.95 | 5.12 | 81.94 | 0.49 | 82.43 | −1.03 | 81.40 | 0.40 | 81.80 | 0.87 | 82.67 | 0.27 | 82.94 | 0.48 | 83.42 | 1.48 |
| Murcia | 83.39 | 80.88 | 85.87 | 4.99 | 82.47 | 0.15 | 82.62 | −0.36 | 82.26 | −0.05 | 82.21 | −0.16 | 82.05 | 0.77 | 82.82 | 0.57 | 83.39 | 0.92 |
| Tarragona | 83.38 | 80.88 | 85.90 | 5.02 | 82.85 | 0.45 | 83.30 | −1.10 | 82.20 | 0.74 | 82.94 | −0.08 | 82.86 | 0.38 | 83.24 | 0.14 | 83.38 | 0.53 |
| Asturias | 83.32 | 80.35 | 86.14 | 5.79 | 82.11 | 0.73 | 82.84 | −0.74 | 82.10 | 0.65 | 82.75 | −0.29 | 82.46 | 0.65 | 83.11 | 0.21 | 83.32 | 1.21 |
| Valencia (València) | 83.28 | 80.73 | 85.68 | 4.95 | 82.19 | 0.69 | 82.88 | −0.72 | 82.16 | 0.06 | 82.22 | 0.12 | 82.34 | 0.63 | 82.97 | 0.31 | 83.28 | 1.09 |
| Castellón (Castelló) | 83.27 | 80.62 | 85.95 | 5.33 | 82.41 | 0.42 | 82.83 | −0.13 | 82.70 | −0.55 | 82.15 | 0.42 | 82.57 | 0.72 | 83.29 | −0.02 | 83.27 | 0.86 |
| Córdoba | 83.18 | 80.39 | 85.88 | 5.49 | 82.39 | 0.36 | 82.75 | −0.50 | 82.25 | −0.13 | 82.12 | −0.18 | 81.94 | 0.69 | 82.63 | 0.55 | 83.18 | 0.79 |
| Málaga | 83.07 | 80.68 | 85.38 | 4.70 | 81.64 | 0.90 | 82.54 | −0.57 | 81.97 | −0.15 | 81.82 | 0.33 | 82.15 | 0.75 | 82.90 | 0.17 | 83.07 | 1.43 |
| Ciudad Real | 83.04 | 80.54 | 85.51 | 4.97 | 82.63 | 0.35 | 82.98 | −2.62 | 80.36 | 2.08 | 82.44 | 0.51 | 82.95 | 0.10 | 83.05 | −0.01 | 83.04 | 0.41 |
| Santa Cruz de Tenerife | 82.88 | 80.71 | 84.94 | 4.23 | 81.95 | 0.61 | 82.56 | 0.07 | 82.63 | −0.33 | 82.30 | −0.29 | 82.01 | 0.84 | 82.85 | 0.03 | 82.88 | 0.93 |
| Badajoz | 82.83 | 80.06 | 85.66 | 5.60 | 81.80 | 0.63 | 82.43 | −0.53 | 81.90 | −0.01 | 81.89 | 0.40 | 82.29 | 0.61 | 82.90 | −0.07 | 82.83 | 1.03 |
| Jaén | 82.80 | 80.19 | 85.40 | 5.21 | 81.94 | 0.34 | 82.28 | −0.93 | 81.35 | 0.45 | 81.80 | −0.08 | 81.72 | 0.96 | 82.68 | 0.12 | 82.80 | 0.86 |
| Seville | 82.73 | 80.00 | 85.35 | 5.35 | 81.59 | 0.40 | 81.99 | −0.60 | 81.39 | 0.05 | 81.44 | 0.30 | 81.74 | 0.84 | 82.58 | 0.15 | 82.73 | 1.14 |
| Las Palmas | 82.68 | 80.37 | 85.01 | 4.64 | 81.74 | 0.53 | 82.27 | −0.37 | 81.90 | 0.02 | 81.92 | −0.36 | 81.56 | 0.52 | 82.08 | 0.60 | 82.68 | 0.94 |
| Melilla (auton. city) | 82.66 | 80.07 | 85.20 | 5.13 | 80.03 | 0.64 | 80.67 | −1.85 | 78.82 | 0.90 | 79.72 | 1.83 | 81.55 | 0.06 | 81.61 | 1.05 | 82.66 | 2.63 |
| Cádiz | 82.55 | 79.89 | 85.18 | 5.29 | 81.17 | 0.54 | 81.71 | −0.63 | 81.08 | −0.33 | 80.75 | 0.69 | 81.44 | 0.57 | 82.01 | 0.54 | 82.55 | 1.38 |
| Huelva | 82.42 | 79.57 | 85.34 | 5.77 | 81.24 | 0.60 | 81.84 | −0.41 | 81.43 | −0.27 | 81.16 | 0.43 | 81.59 | 0.24 | 81.83 | 0.59 | 82.42 | 1.18 |
| Almería | 82.10 | 79.43 | 84.90 | 5.47 | 81.82 | 0.11 | 81.93 | −0.73 | 81.20 | −0.59 | 80.61 | 0.70 | 81.31 | 0.50 | 81.81 | 0.29 | 82.10 | 0.28 |
| Ceuta (auton. city) | 81.60 | 79.63 | 83.51 | 3.88 | 79.82 | 0.60 | 80.42 | −1.28 | 79.14 | −0.84 | 78.30 | 1.41 | 79.71 | 1.40 | 81.11 | 0.49 | 81.60 | 1.78 |

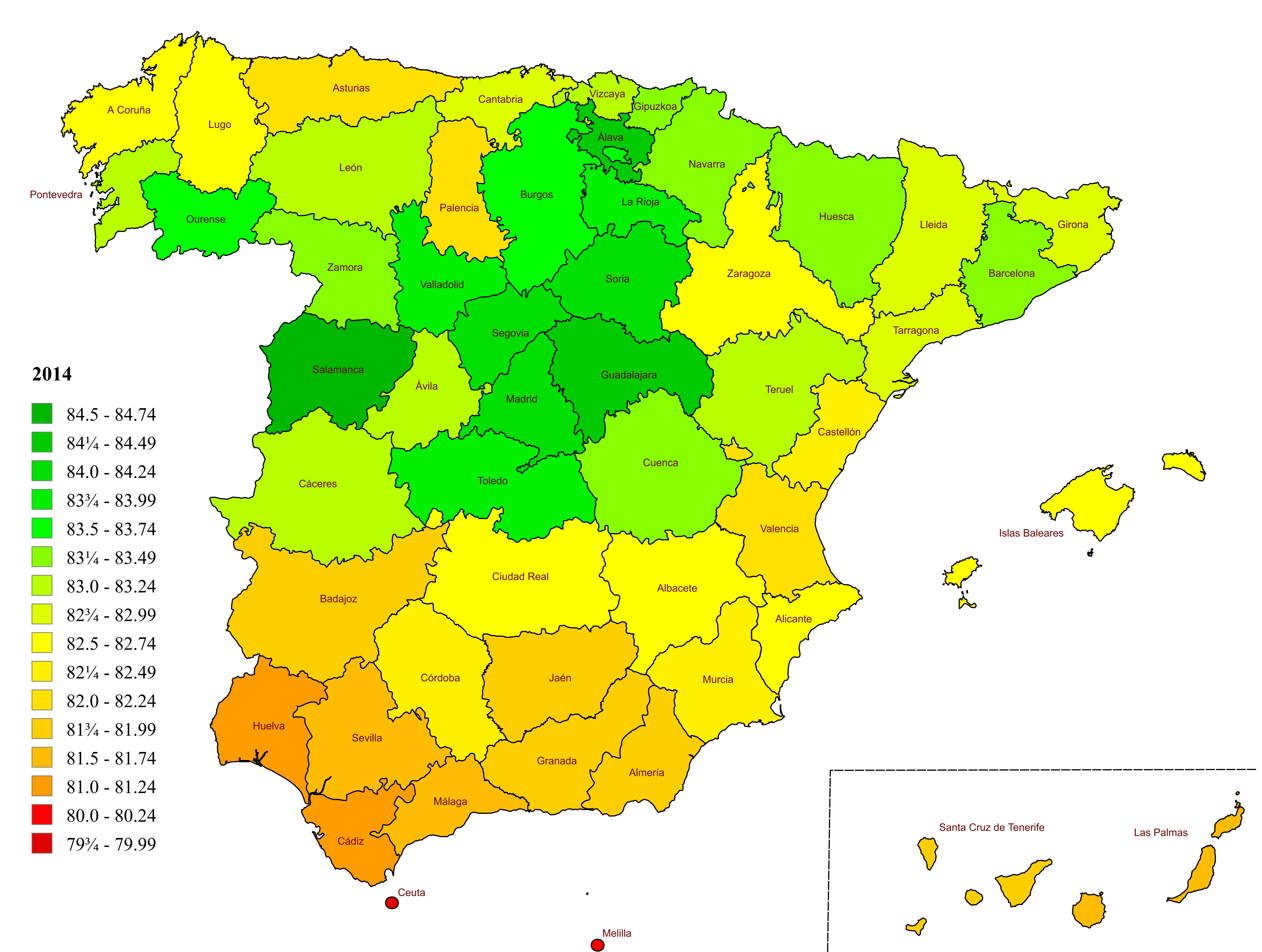
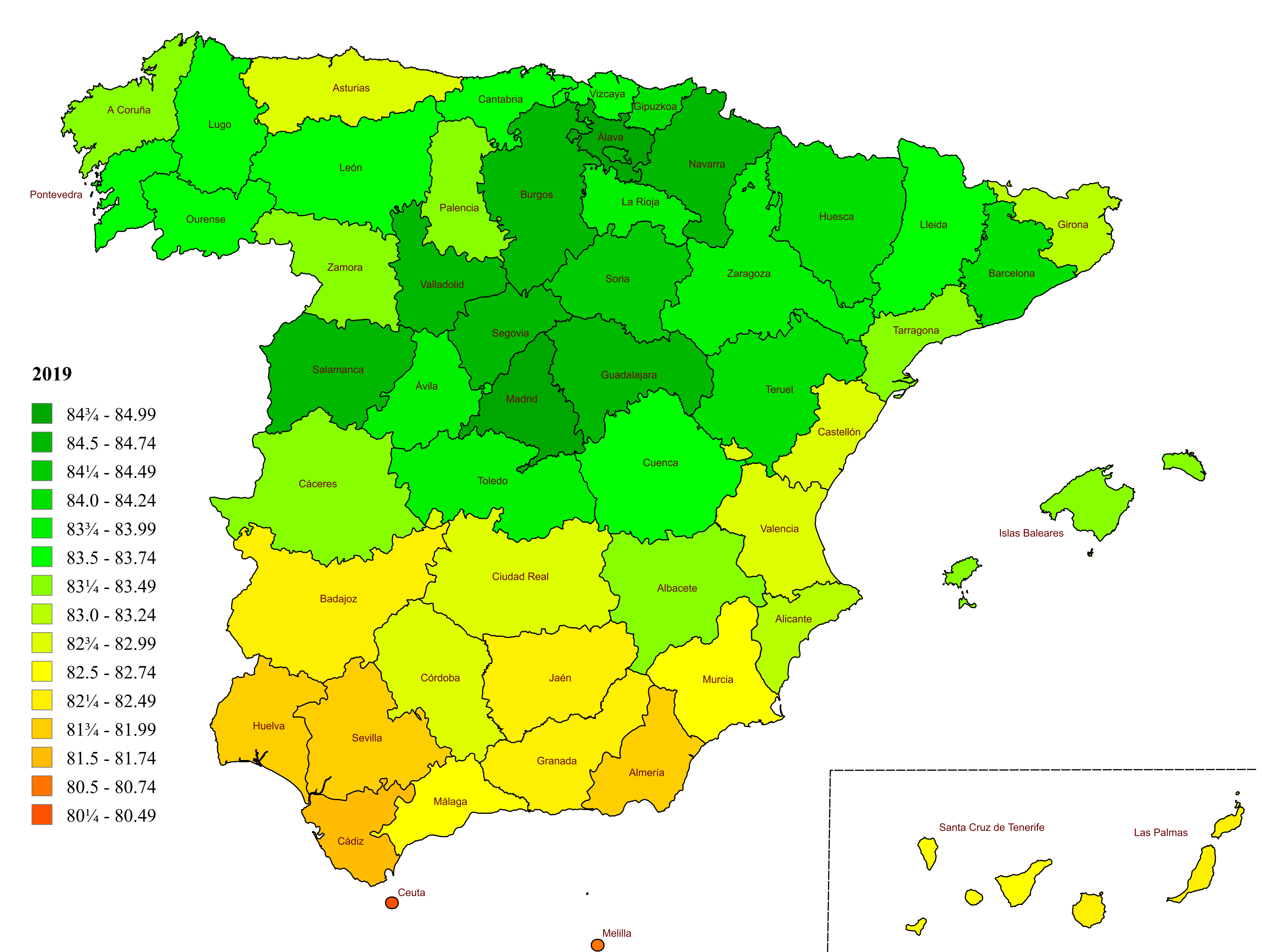
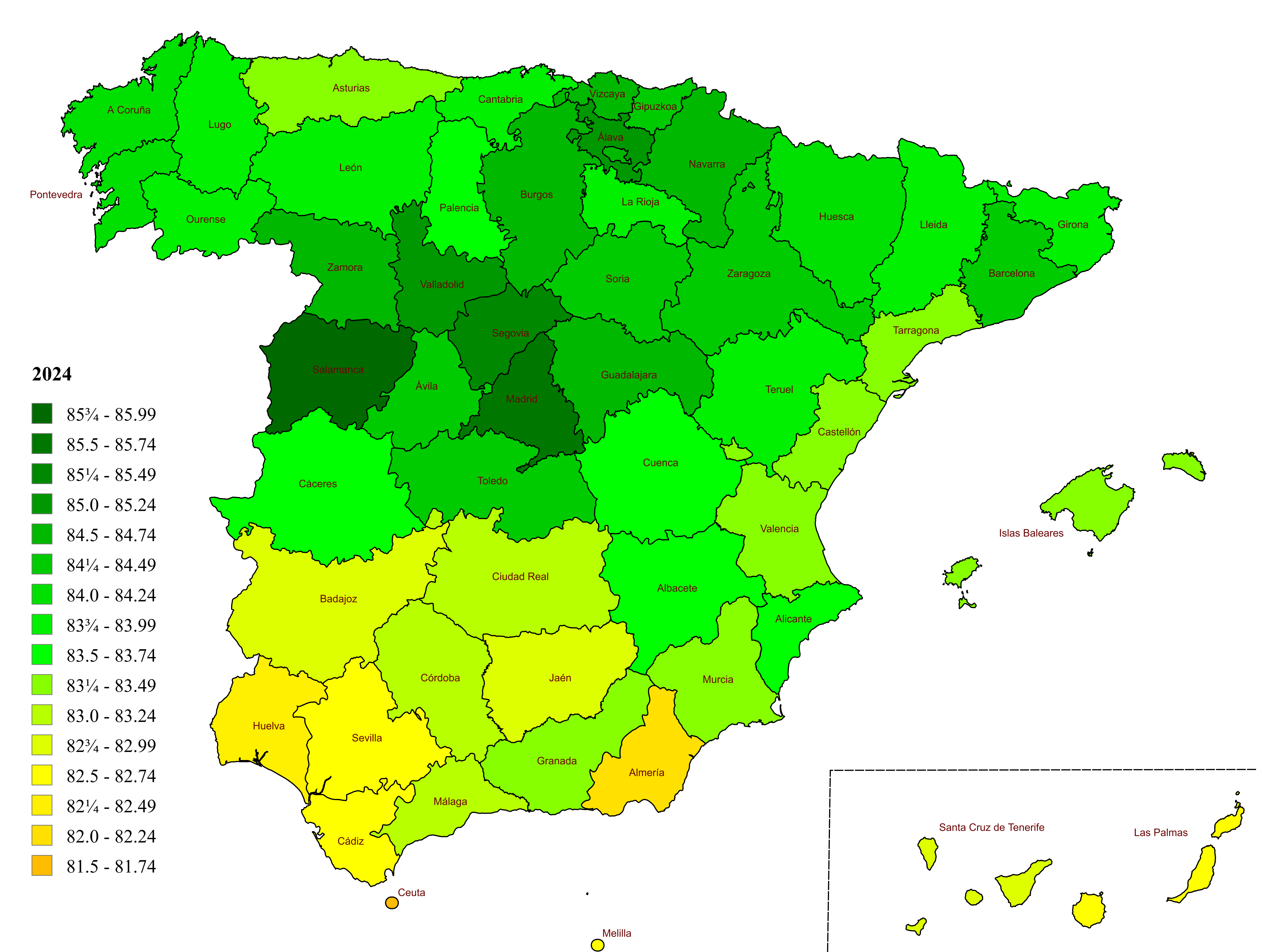
Maps of life expectancy in provinces of Spain in 2014, 2019, 2024
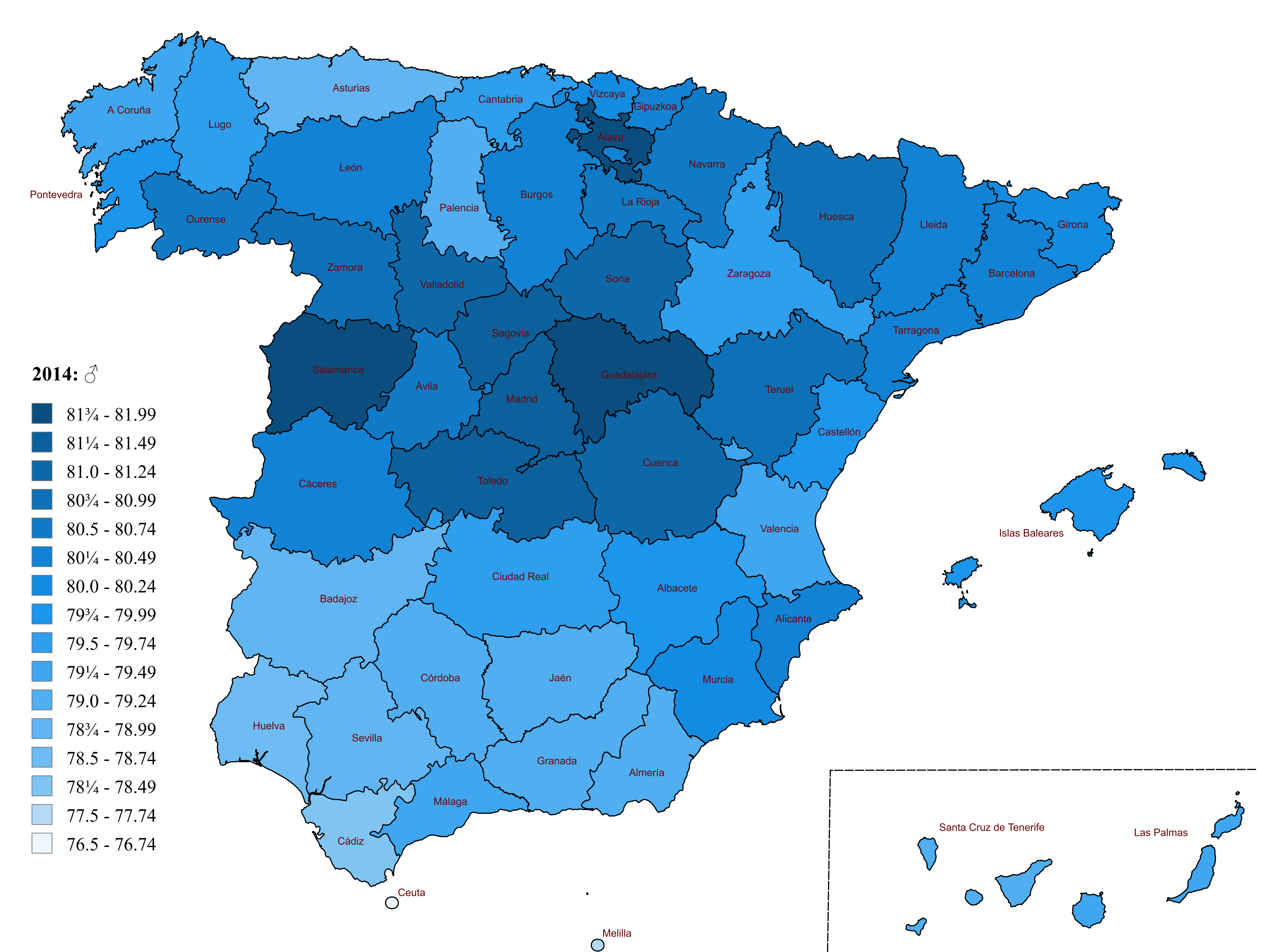
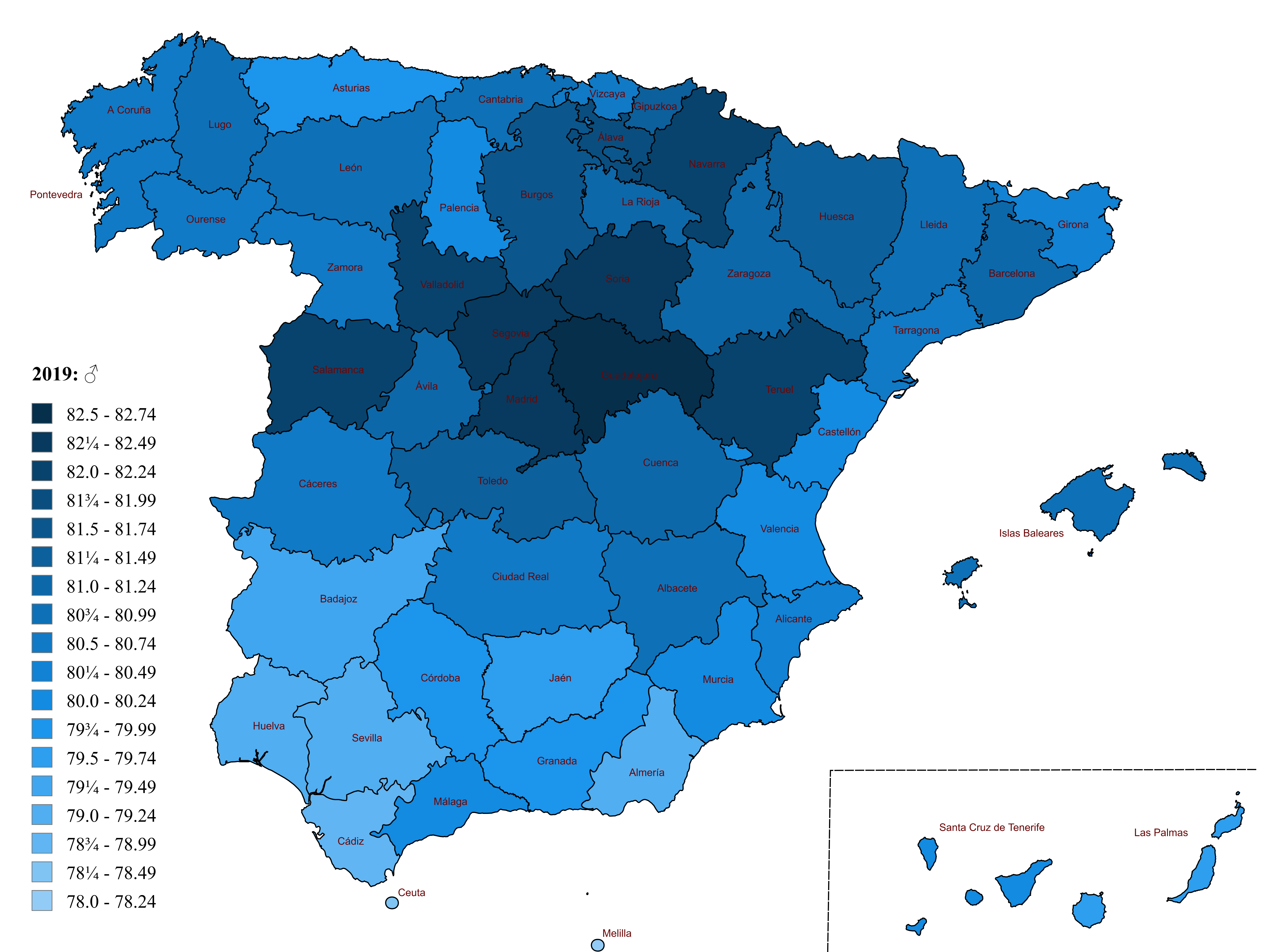
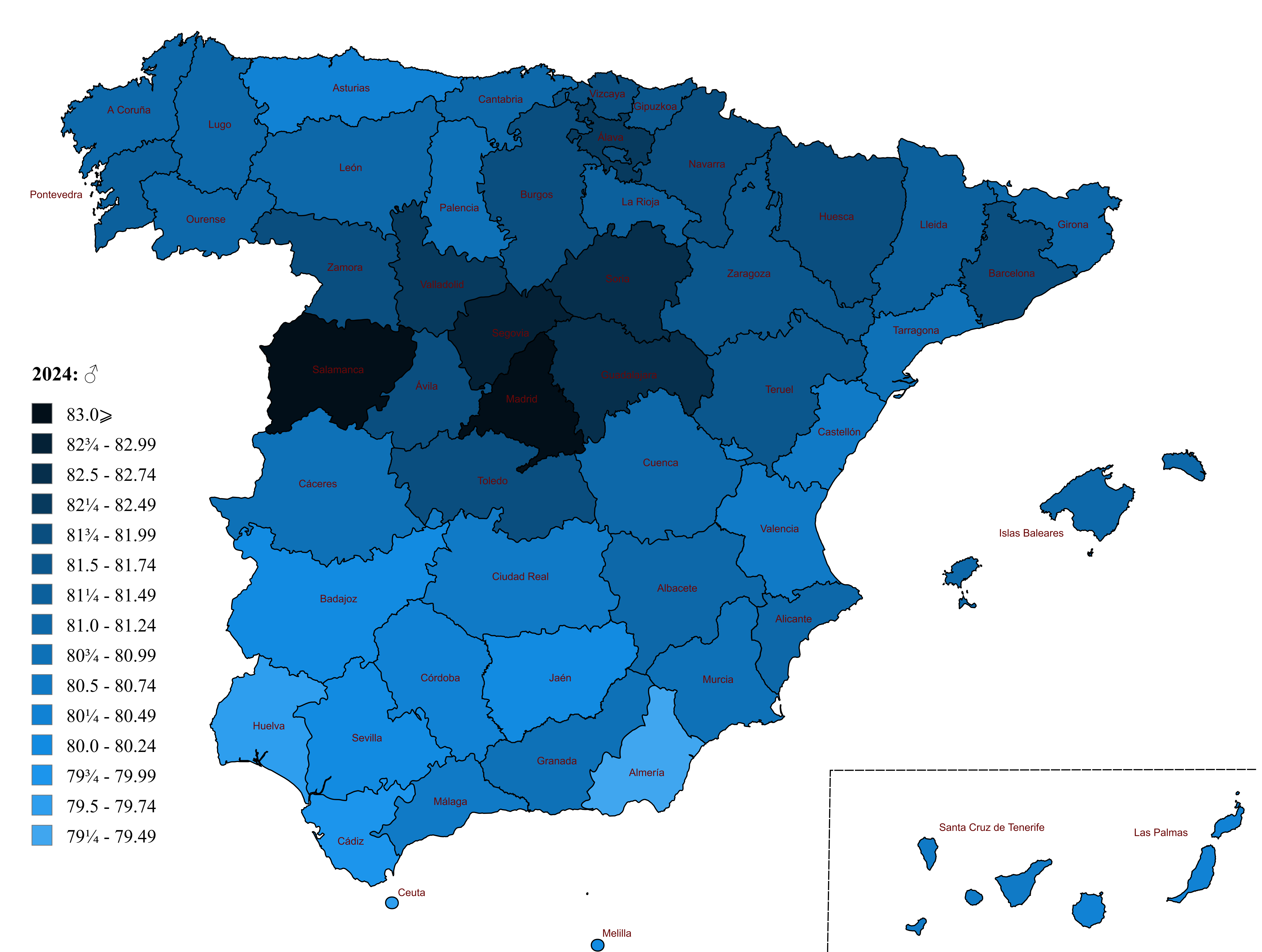
Maps of life expectancy for male
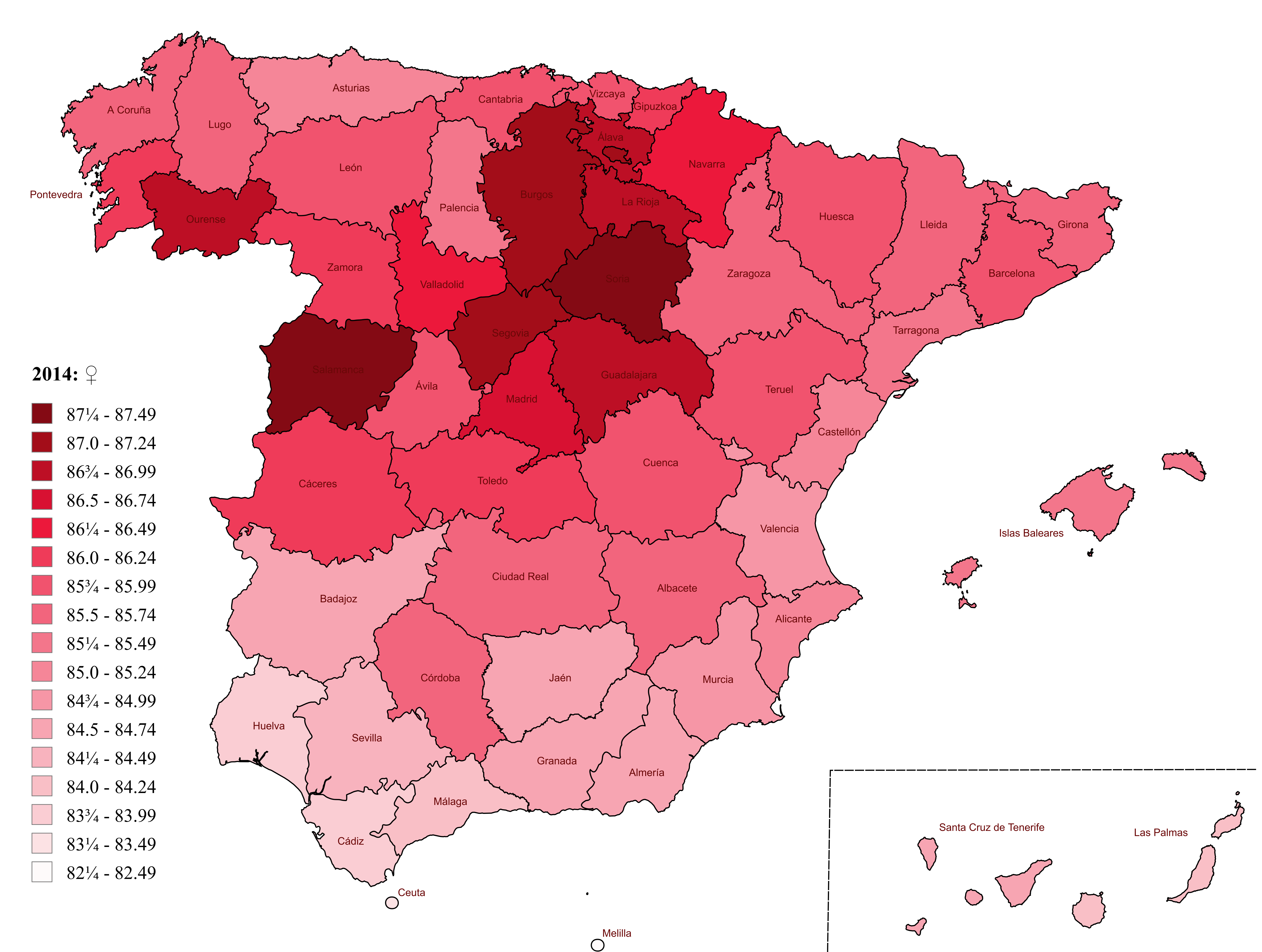
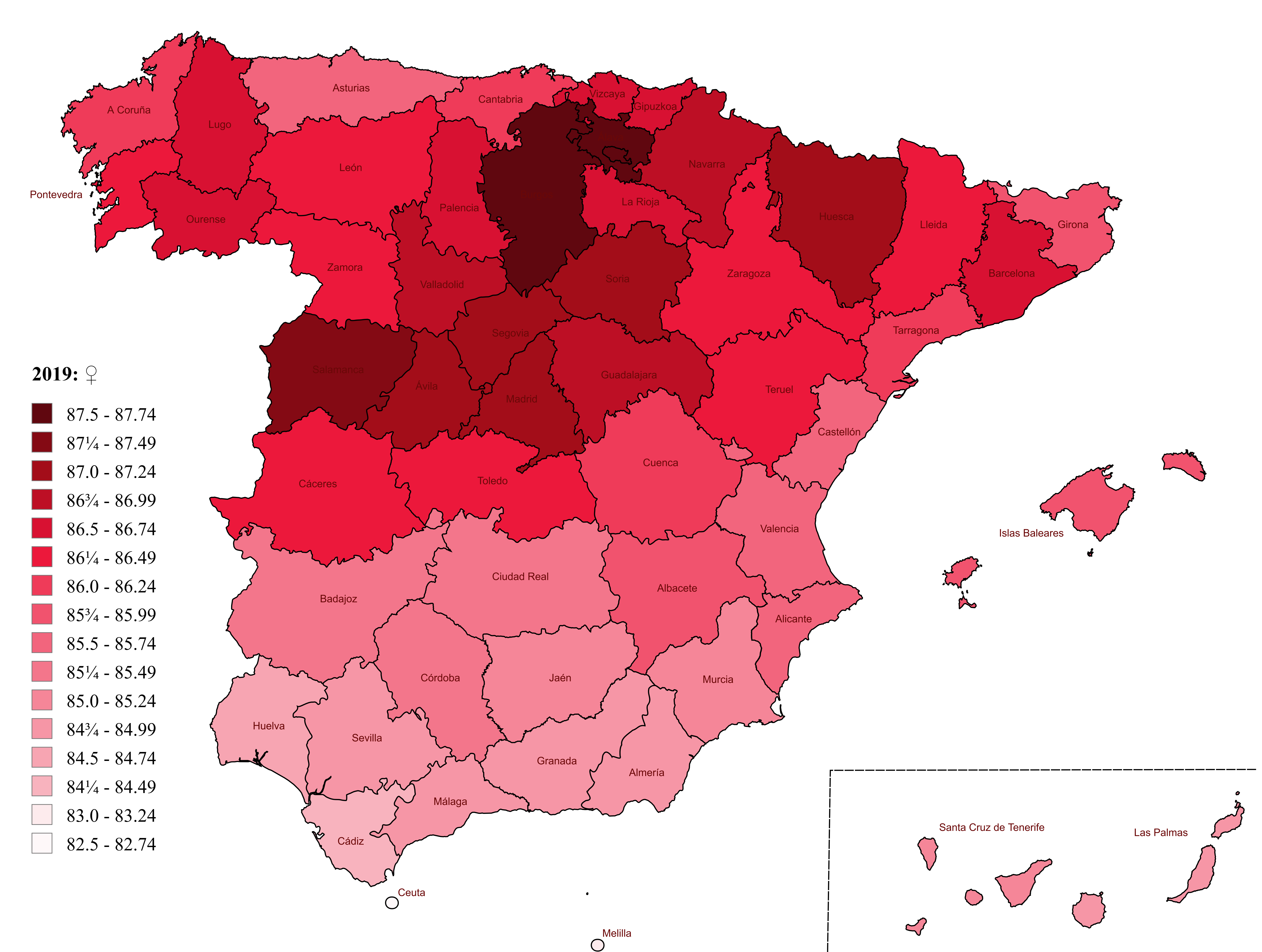
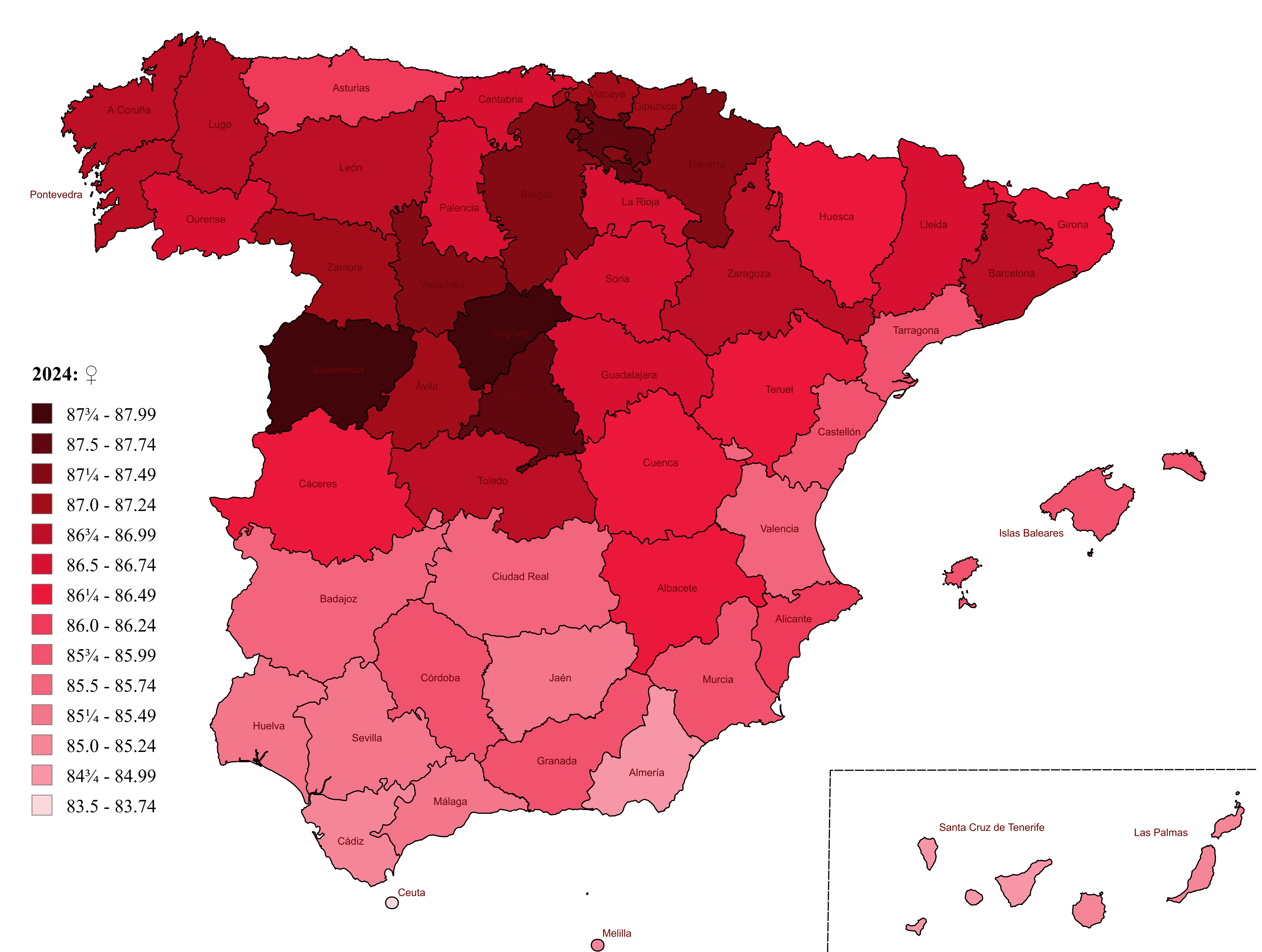
Maps of life expectancy for female

Data source: National Statistics Institute (Spain) (Instituto Nacional de Estadística)

=== Statistics by autonomous community ===
| autonomous community | 2024 | | | | historical data | | | | | | | | | | | | | |
| autonomous community | overall | male | female | sex gap | 2014 | 2014 →2019 | 2019 | 2019 →2020 | 2020 | 2020 →2021 | 2021 | 2021 →2022 | 2022 | 2022 →2023 | 2023 | 2023 →2024 | 2024 | 2014 →2024 |
|---|---|---|---|---|---|---|---|---|---|---|---|---|---|---|---|---|---|---|
| Spain on average | 84.01 | 81.38 | 86.53 | 5.15 | 82.91 | 0.62 | 83.53 | −1.25 | 82.28 | 0.75 | 83.03 | 0.05 | 83.08 | 0.69 | 83.77 | 0.24 | 84.01 | 1.10 |
| Madrid | 85.58 | 83.07 | 87.74 | 4.67 | 84.20 | 0.73 | 84.93 | −2.66 | 82.27 | 2.29 | 84.56 | 0.20 | 84.76 | 0.63 | 85.39 | 0.19 | 85.58 | 0.65 |
| Castile and León | 84.67 | 82.08 | 87.28 | 5.20 | 83.60 | 0.60 | 84.20 | −1.67 | 82.53 | 1.41 | 83.94 | −0.26 | 83.68 | 0.86 | 84.54 | 0.13 | 84.67 | 0.47 |
| Navarre | 84.66 | 81.96 | 87.33 | 5.37 | 83.45 | 1.10 | 84.55 | −1.22 | 83.33 | 0.93 | 84.26 | −0.41 | 83.85 | 0.94 | 84.79 | −0.13 | 84.66 | 0.11 |
| Basque Country | 84.64 | 81.91 | 87.20 | 5.29 | 83.35 | 0.63 | 83.98 | −0.80 | 83.18 | 0.52 | 83.70 | −0.21 | 83.49 | 0.93 | 84.42 | 0.22 | 84.64 | 0.66 |
| Aragon | 84.24 | 81.71 | 86.72 | 5.01 | 82.85 | 1.03 | 83.88 | −1.50 | 82.38 | 0.87 | 83.25 | −0.19 | 83.06 | 1.01 | 84.07 | 0.17 | 84.24 | 0.36 |
| Catalonia | 84.24 | 81.64 | 86.69 | 5.05 | 83.17 | 0.65 | 83.82 | −1.57 | 82.25 | 1.09 | 83.34 | 0.15 | 83.49 | 0.47 | 83.96 | 0.28 | 84.24 | 0.42 |
| Galicia | 84.09 | 81.23 | 86.86 | 5.63 | 82.91 | 0.60 | 83.51 | −0.18 | 83.33 | 0.08 | 83.41 | −0.18 | 83.23 | 0.39 | 83.62 | 0.47 | 84.09 | 0.58 |
| La Rioja | 83.90 | 81.30 | 86.51 | 5.21 | 83.78 | 0.05 | 83.83 | −1.33 | 82.50 | 0.77 | 83.27 | −0.07 | 83.20 | 0.97 | 84.17 | −0.27 | 83.90 | 0.07 |
| Cantabria | 83.89 | 81.01 | 86.62 | 5.61 | 82.78 | 0.80 | 83.58 | −0.58 | 83.00 | 0.63 | 83.63 | −0.57 | 83.06 | 1.14 | 84.20 | −0.31 | 83.89 | 0.31 |
| Castilla–La Mancha | 83.85 | 81.43 | 86.33 | 4.90 | 83.28 | 0.29 | 83.57 | −2.35 | 81.22 | 1.80 | 83.02 | 0.31 | 83.33 | 0.45 | 83.78 | 0.07 | 83.85 | 0.28 |
| Balearic Islands | 83.46 | 81.06 | 85.81 | 4.75 | 82.60 | 0.80 | 83.40 | −0.29 | 83.11 | −0.11 | 83.00 | −0.10 | 82.90 | 0.81 | 83.71 | −0.25 | 83.46 | 0.06 |
| Valencia | 83.40 | 80.89 | 85.84 | 4.95 | 82.39 | 0.56 | 82.95 | −0.63 | 82.32 | −0.11 | 82.21 | 0.26 | 82.47 | 0.63 | 83.10 | 0.30 | 83.40 | 0.45 |
| Murcia | 83.39 | 80.88 | 85.87 | 4.99 | 82.47 | 0.15 | 82.62 | −0.36 | 82.26 | −0.05 | 82.21 | −0.16 | 82.05 | 0.77 | 82.82 | 0.57 | 83.39 | 0.77 |
| Asturias | 83.32 | 80.35 | 86.14 | 5.79 | 82.11 | 0.73 | 82.84 | −0.74 | 82.10 | 0.65 | 82.75 | −0.29 | 82.46 | 0.65 | 83.11 | 0.21 | 83.32 | 0.48 |
| Extremadura | 83.13 | 80.36 | 85.99 | 5.63 | 82.35 | 0.49 | 82.84 | −1.01 | 81.83 | 0.36 | 82.19 | 0.21 | 82.40 | 0.66 | 83.06 | 0.07 | 83.13 | 0.29 |
| Andalusia | 82.82 | 80.18 | 85.42 | 5.24 | 81.70 | 0.50 | 82.20 | −0.69 | 81.51 | −0.05 | 81.46 | 0.40 | 81.86 | 0.63 | 82.49 | 0.33 | 82.82 | 0.62 |
| Canary Islands | 82.79 | 80.54 | 84.99 | 4.45 | 81.86 | 0.56 | 82.42 | −0.16 | 82.26 | −0.14 | 82.12 | −0.34 | 81.78 | 0.68 | 82.46 | 0.33 | 82.79 | 0.37 |
| Melilla (auton. city) | 82.66 | 80.07 | 85.20 | 5.13 | 80.03 | 0.64 | 80.67 | −1.85 | 78.82 | 0.90 | 79.72 | 1.83 | 81.55 | 0.06 | 81.61 | 1.05 | 82.66 | 1.99 |
| Ceuta (auton. city) | 81.60 | 79.63 | 83.51 | 3.88 | 79.82 | 0.60 | 80.42 | −1.28 | 79.14 | −0.84 | 78.30 | 1.41 | 79.71 | 1.40 | 81.11 | 0.49 | 81.60 | 1.18 |

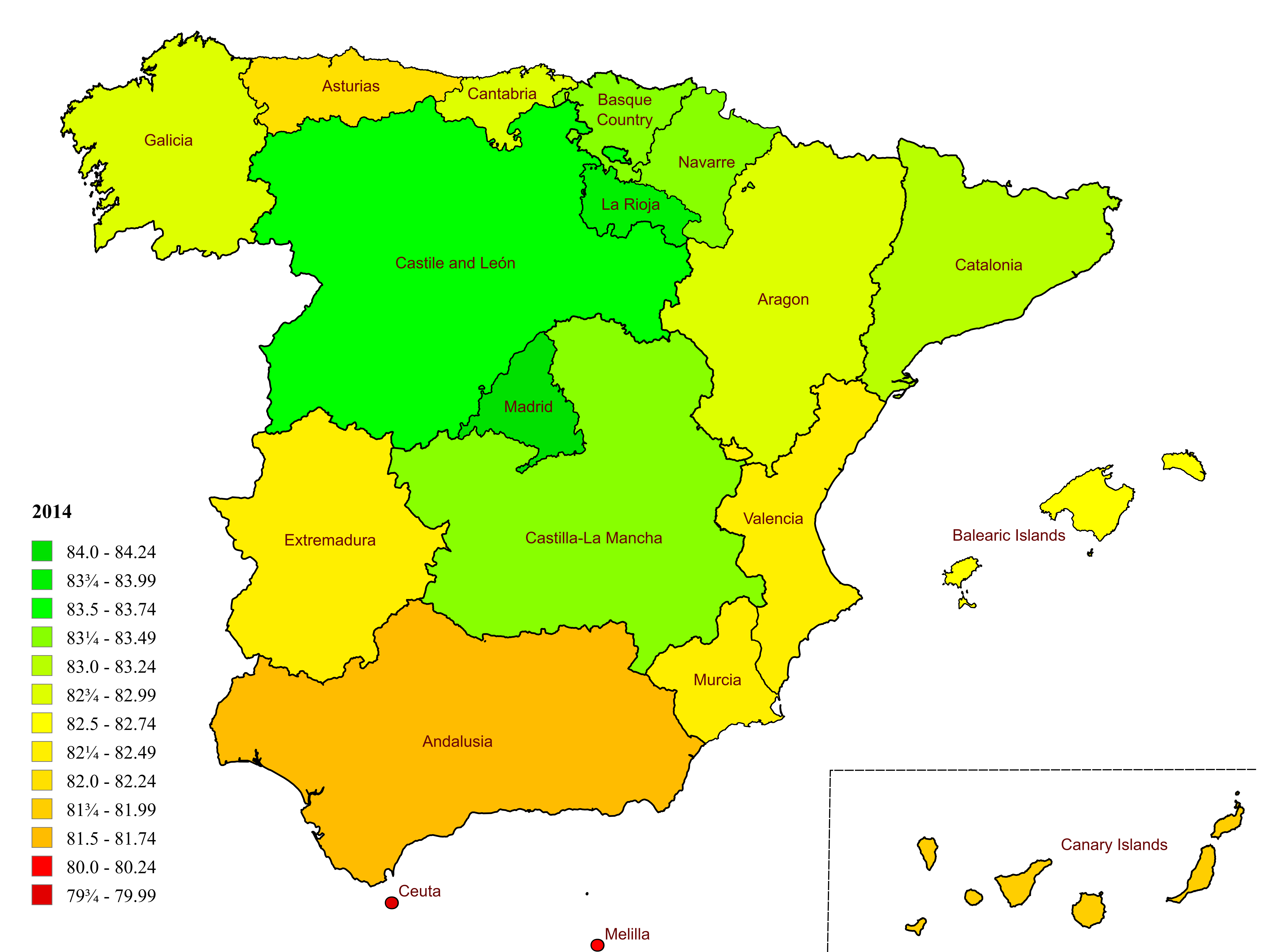
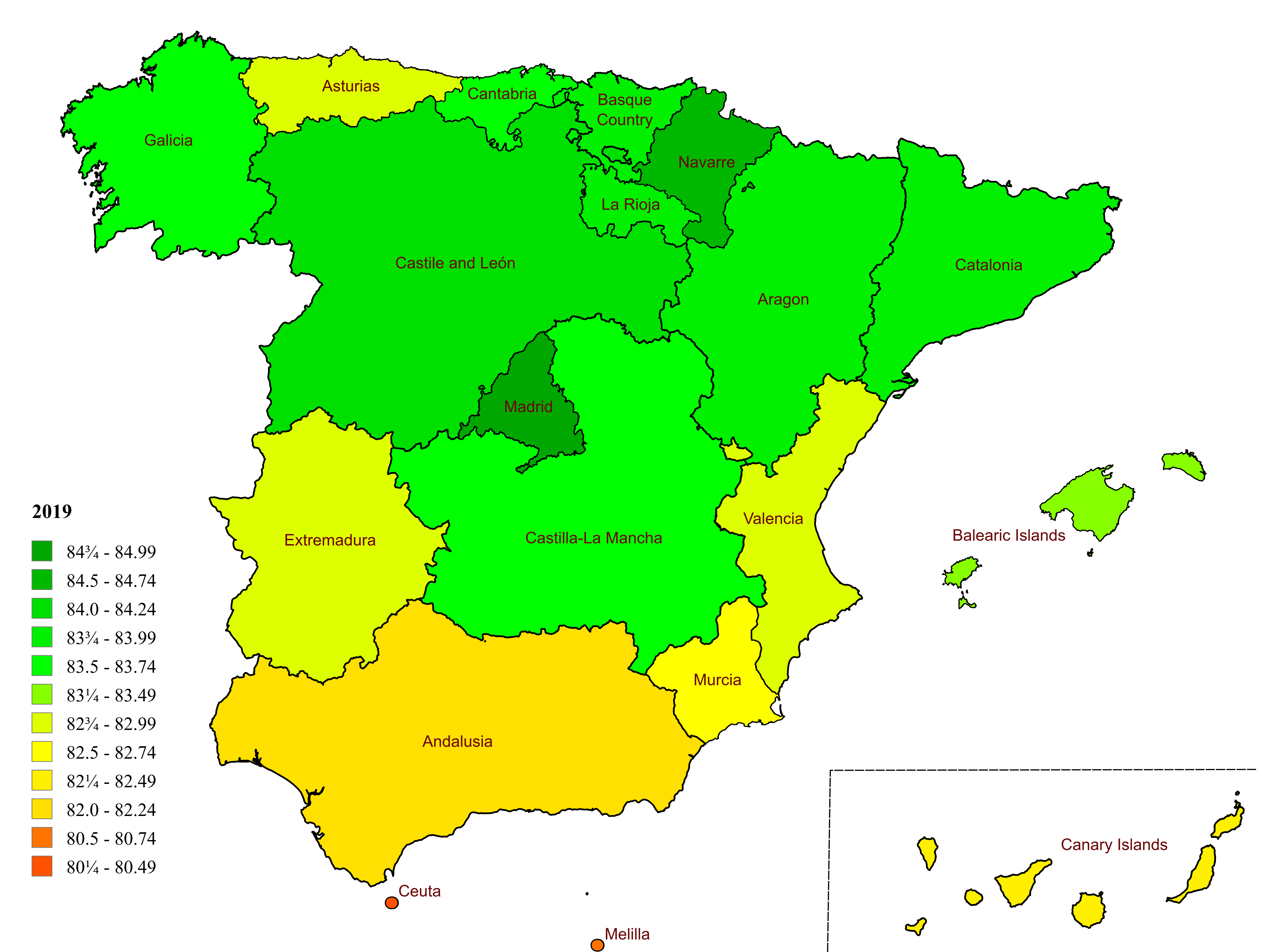
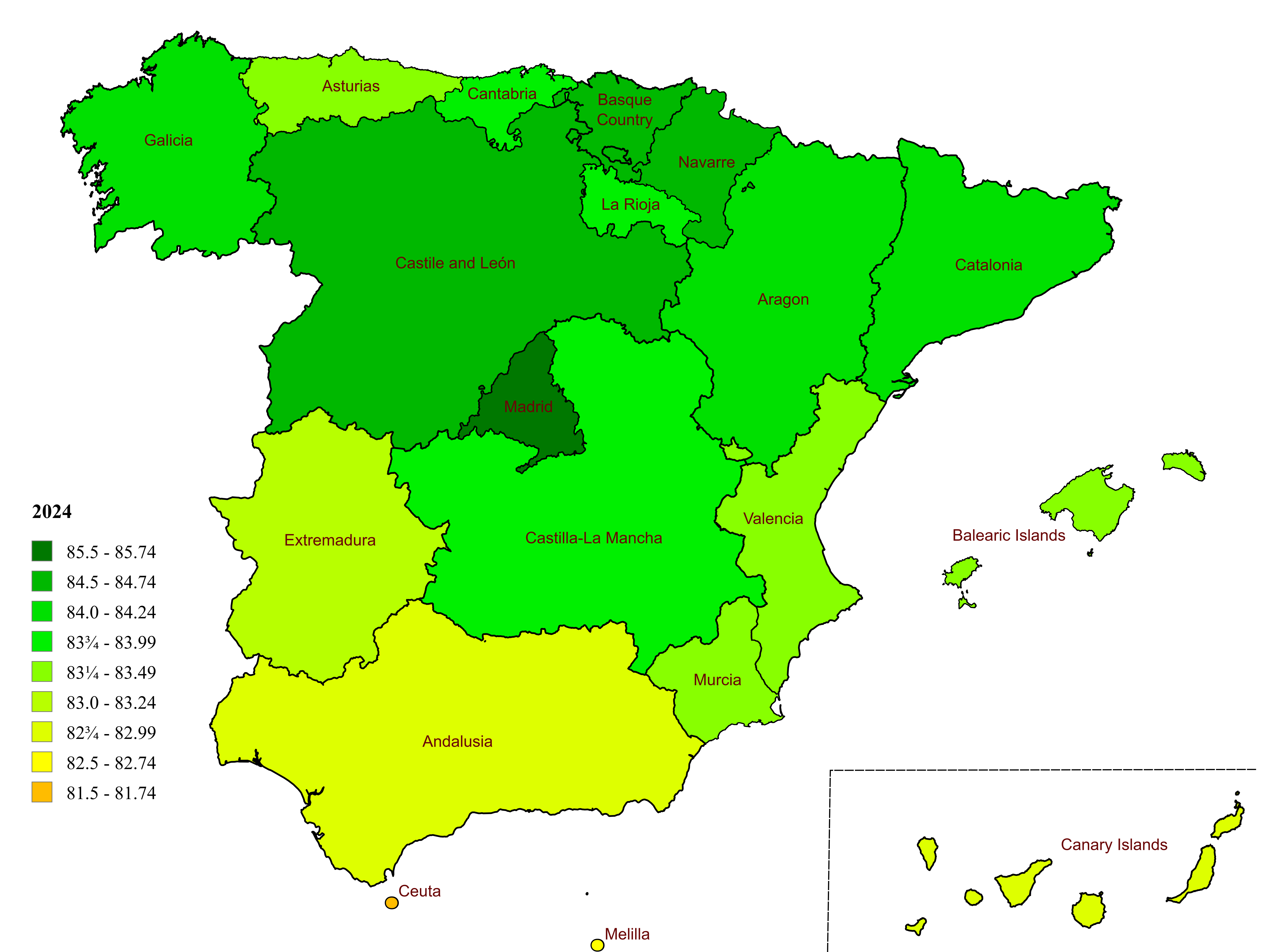
Maps of life expectancy in autonomous communities of Spain in 2014, 2019, 2024
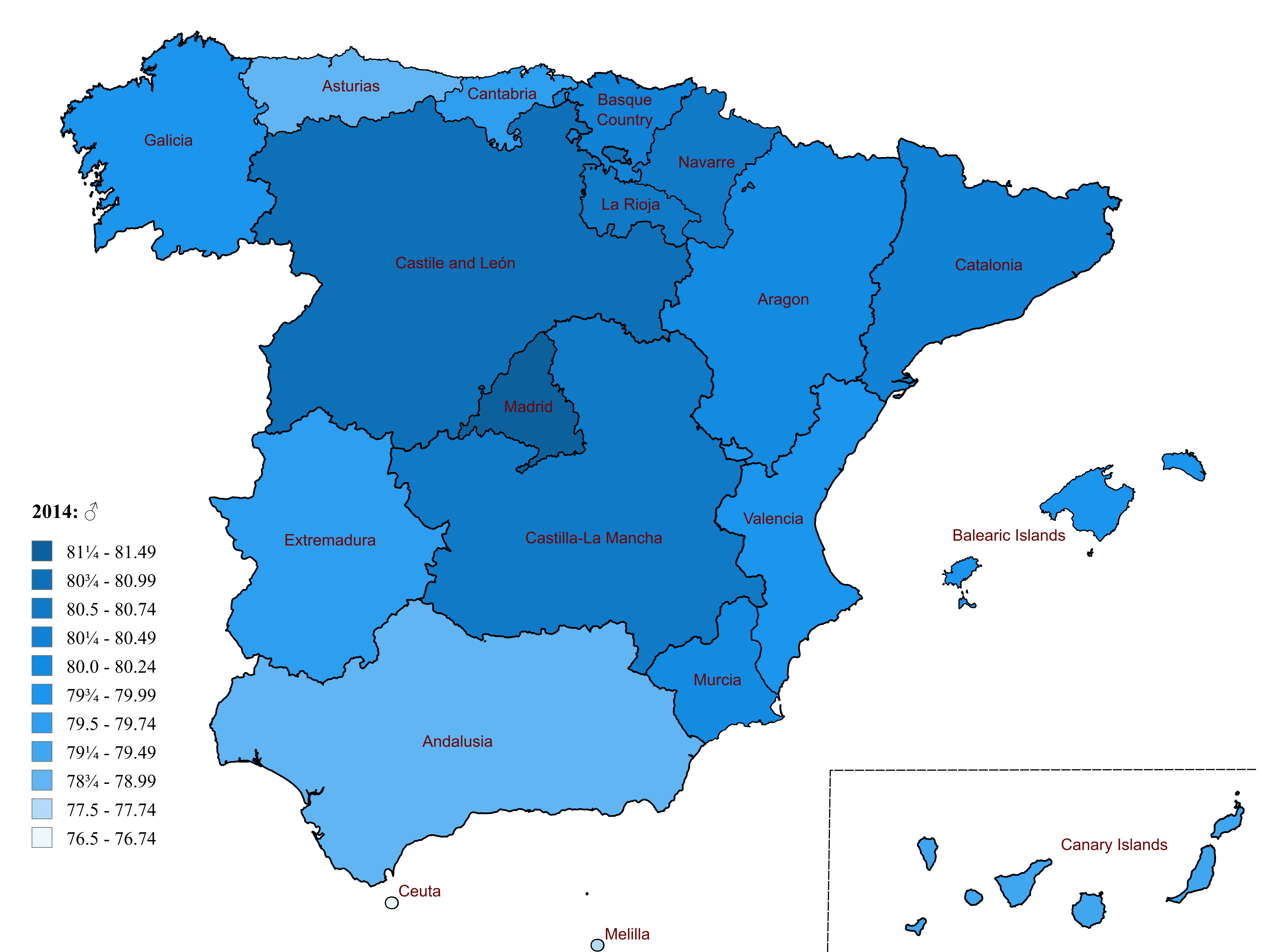
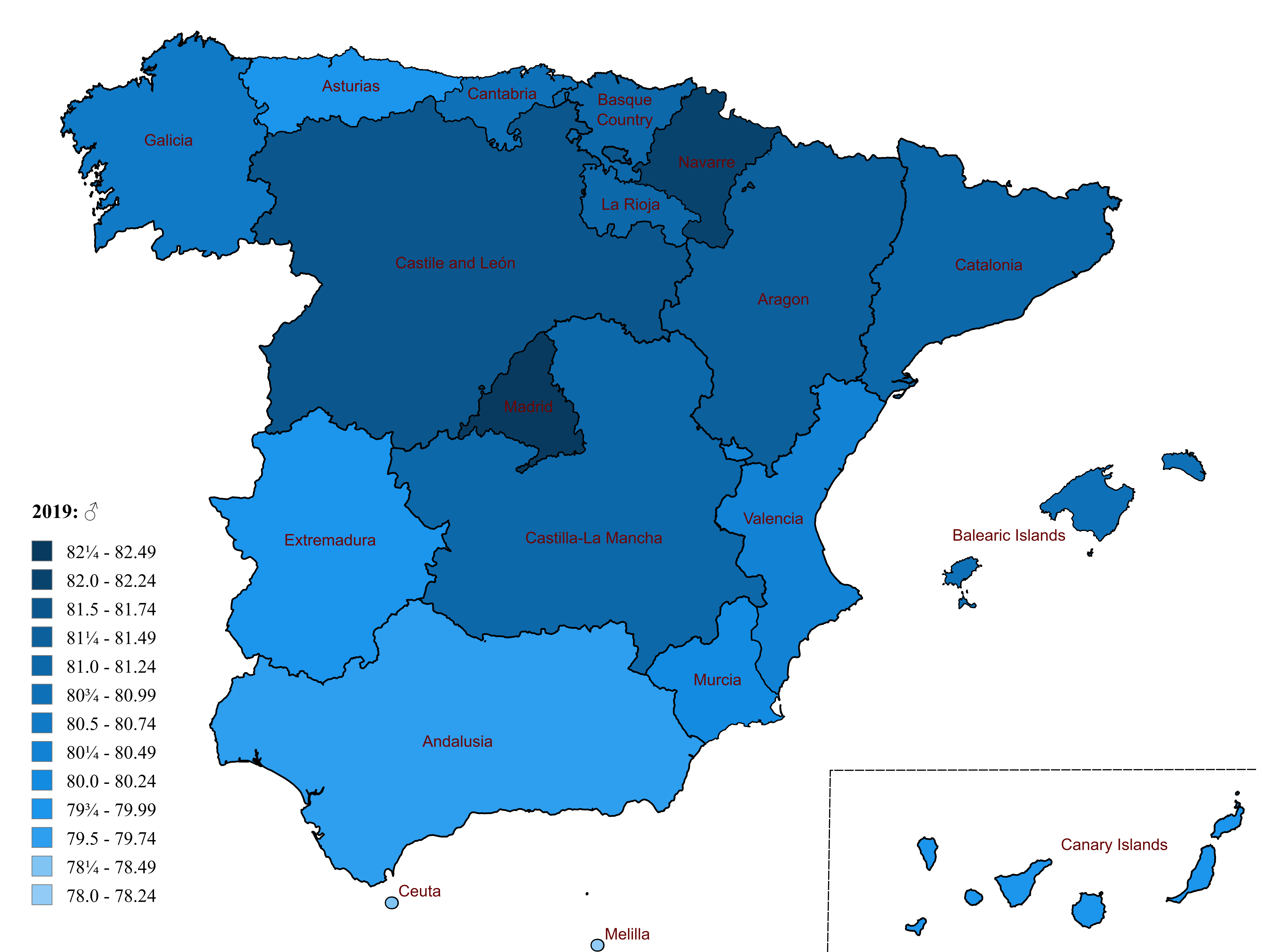
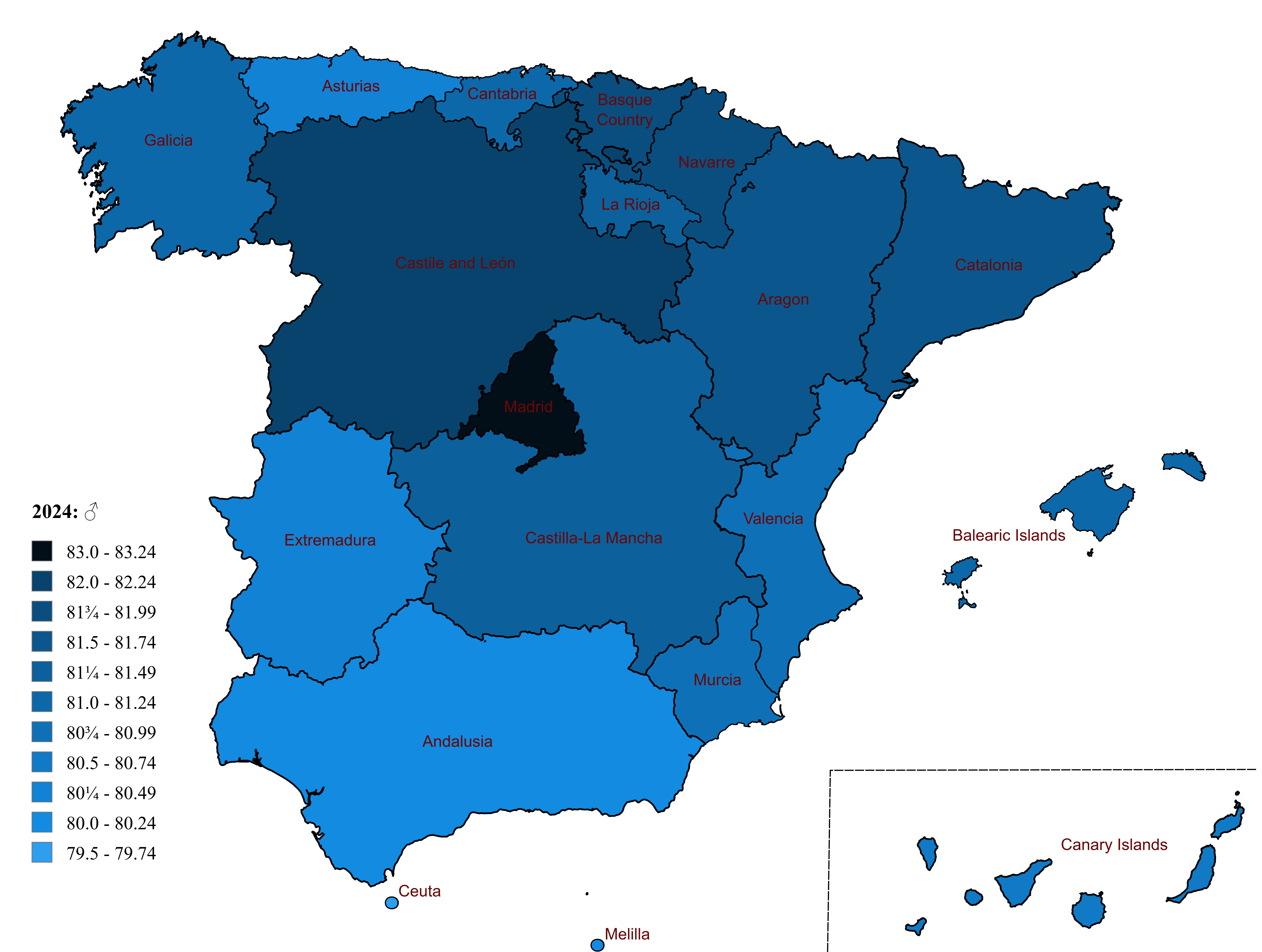
Maps of life expectancy for male
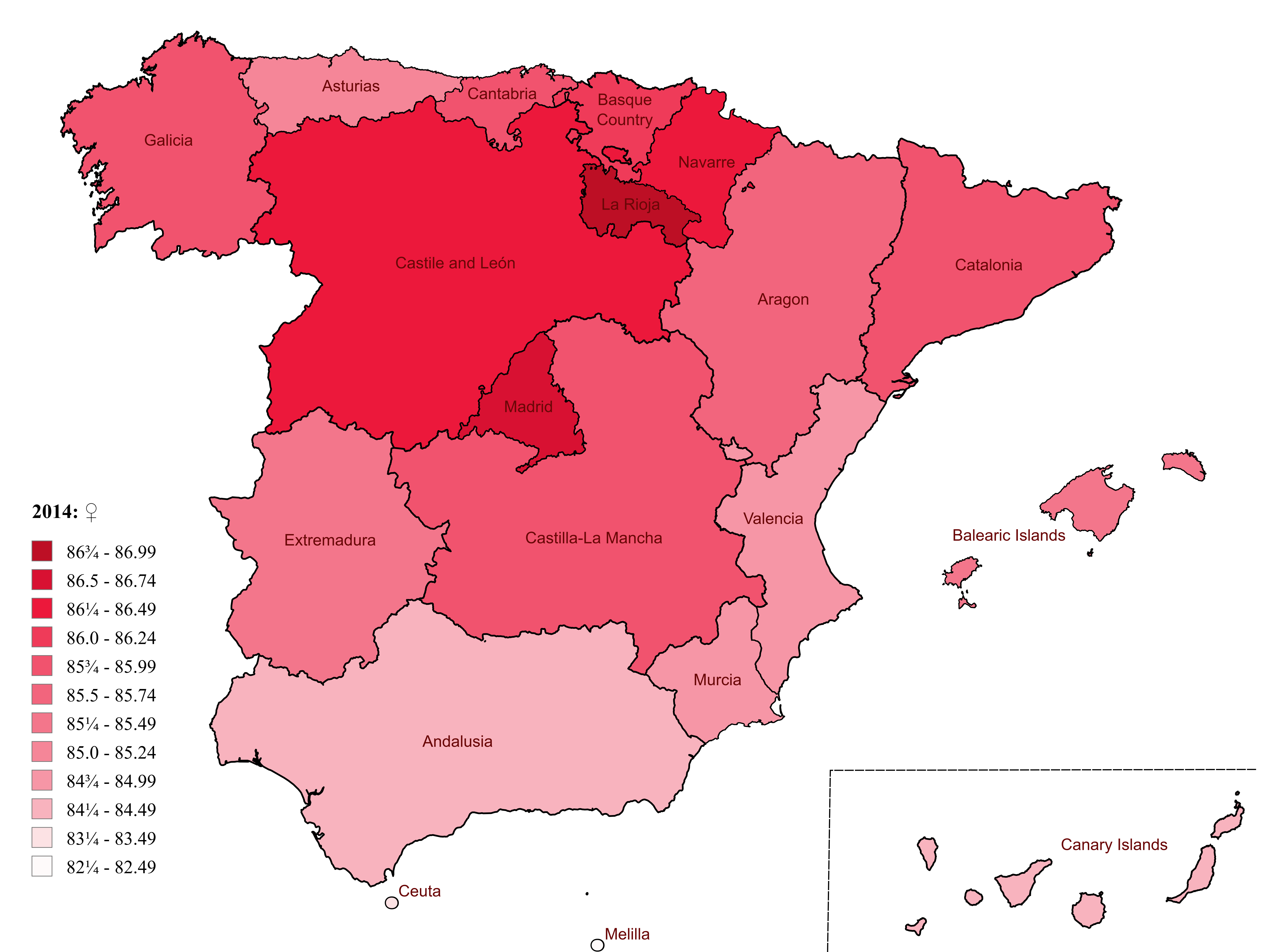
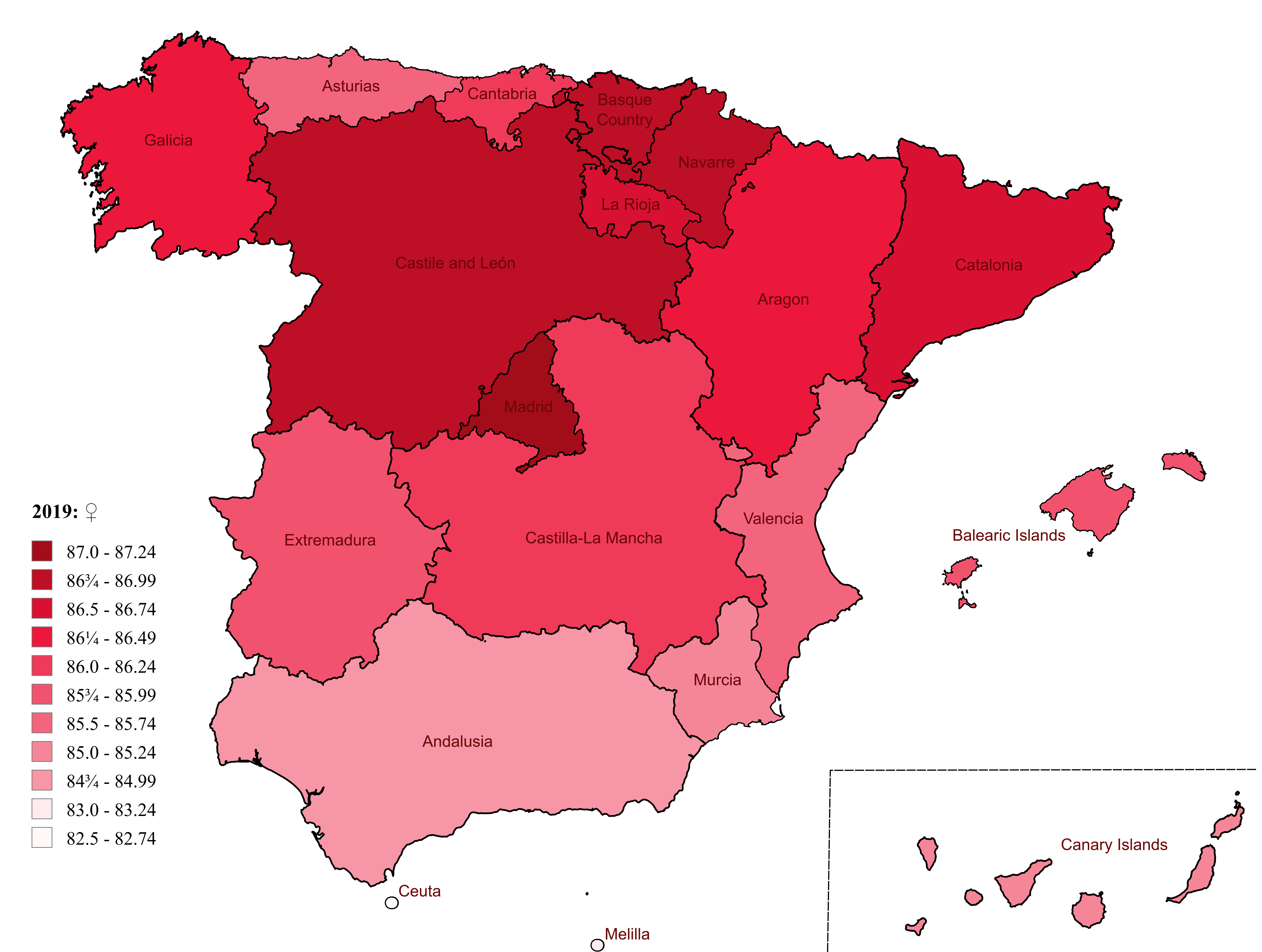
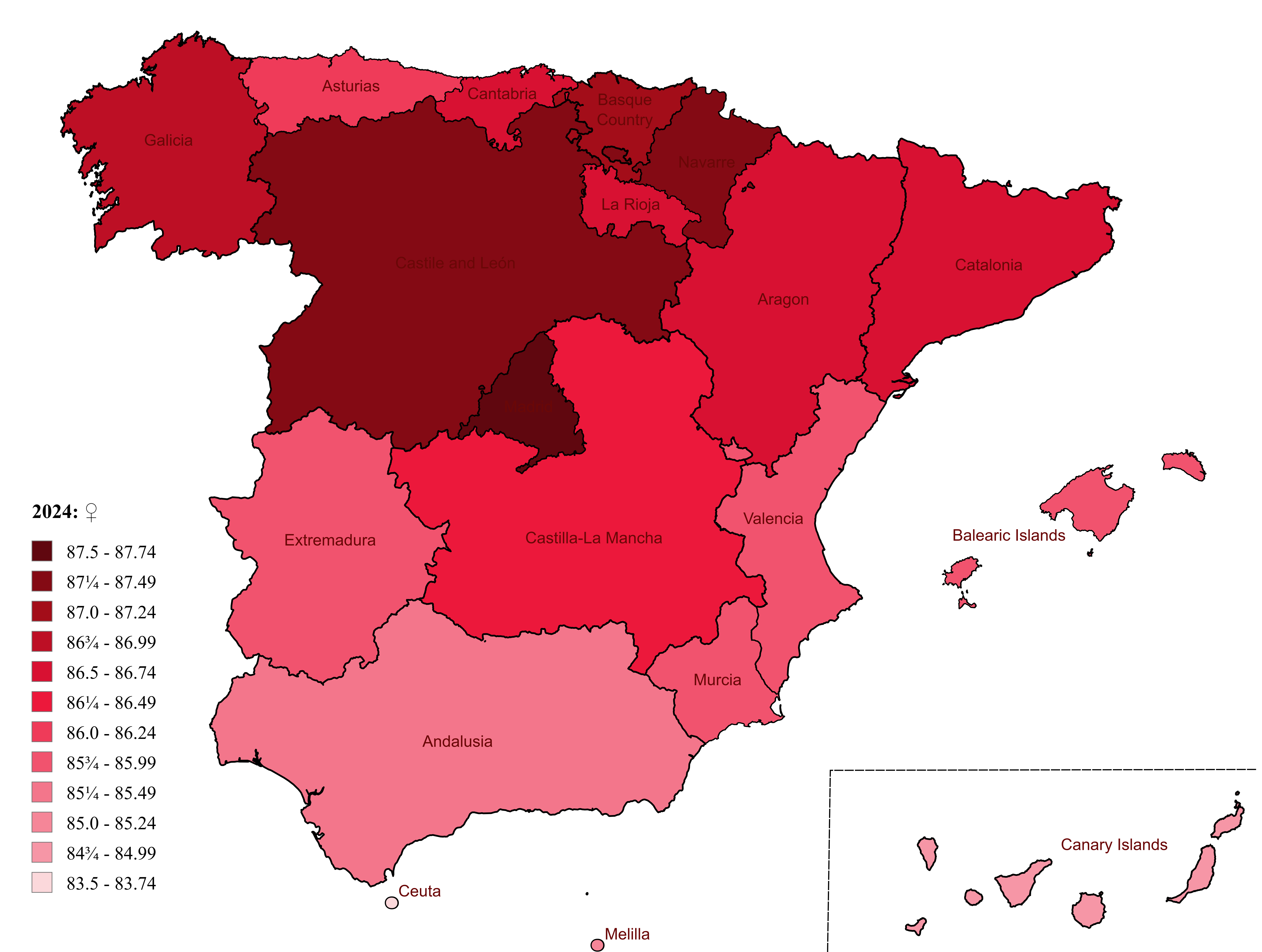
Maps of life expectancy for female

Data source: National Statistics Institute (Spain) (Instituto Nacional de Estadística)

== Eurostat (2014—2023) ==
The division of Spain into territorial units 2 level (NUTS 2) coincides with the division of Spain into autonomous communities. By default the table is sorted by 2023.

| code | region | 2014 | | | | 2014 →2019 | 2019 | | | | 2019 →2023 | 2023 | | | | 2014 →2023 |
| code | region | overall | male | female | F Δ M | 2014 →2019 | overall | male | female | F Δ M | 2019 →2023 | overall | male | female | F Δ M | 2014 →2023 |
|---|---|---|---|---|---|---|---|---|---|---|---|---|---|---|---|---|
| | Spain on average | 83.3 | 80.4 | 86.2 | 5.8 | 0.7 | 84.0 | 81.1 | 86.7 | 5.6 | 0.0 | 84.0 | 81.3 | 86.7 | 5.4 | 0.7 |
| ES30 | Madrid | 84.9 | 81.9 | 87.6 | 5.7 | 0.9 | 85.8 | 83.0 | 88.2 | 5.2 | 0.3 | 86.1 | 83.4 | 88.3 | 4.9 | 1.2 |
| ES22 | Navarre | 83.9 | 80.9 | 86.9 | 6.0 | 1.1 | 85.0 | 82.4 | 87.5 | 5.1 | 0.0 | 85.0 | 82.4 | 87.6 | 5.2 | 1.1 |
| ES41 | Castile and León | 84.1 | 81.2 | 87.2 | 6.0 | 0.6 | 84.7 | 81.8 | 87.6 | 5.8 | 0.2 | 84.9 | 82.1 | 87.7 | 5.6 | 0.8 |
| ES21 | Basque Country | 83.9 | 80.7 | 86.9 | 6.2 | 0.6 | 84.5 | 81.4 | 87.5 | 6.1 | 0.2 | 84.7 | 81.8 | 87.4 | 5.6 | 0.8 |
| ES13 | Cantabria | 83.1 | 79.9 | 86.3 | 6.4 | 0.8 | 83.9 | 81.1 | 86.7 | 5.6 | 0.5 | 84.4 | 81.4 | 87.3 | 5.9 | 1.3 |
| ES23 | La Rioja | 84.2 | 81.0 | 87.5 | 6.5 | 0.0 | 84.2 | 81.3 | 87.1 | 5.8 | 0.1 | 84.3 | 81.4 | 87.1 | 5.7 | 0.1 |
| ES51 | Catalonia | 83.6 | 80.6 | 86.5 | 5.9 | 0.7 | 84.3 | 81.3 | 87.1 | 5.8 | −0.1 | 84.2 | 81.4 | 86.9 | 5.5 | 0.6 |
| ES24 | Aragon | 83.2 | 80.3 | 86.3 | 6.0 | 1.2 | 84.4 | 81.5 | 87.2 | 5.7 | −0.2 | 84.2 | 81.3 | 87.1 | 5.8 | 1.0 |
| ES42 | Castilla–La Mancha | 83.7 | 81.0 | 86.5 | 5.5 | 0.2 | 83.9 | 81.5 | 86.5 | 5.0 | 0.1 | 84.0 | 81.5 | 86.6 | 5.1 | 0.3 |
| ES53 | Balearic Islands | 83.0 | 80.2 | 85.7 | 5.5 | 1.2 | 84.2 | 81.7 | 86.6 | 4.9 | −0.2 | 84.0 | 81.5 | 86.4 | 4.9 | 1.0 |
| ES11 | Galicia | 83.4 | 80.1 | 86.6 | 6.5 | 0.6 | 84.0 | 81.0 | 87.0 | 6.0 | 0.0 | 84.0 | 80.8 | 87.0 | 6.2 | 0.6 |
| ES52 | Valencian Community | 82.8 | 80.2 | 85.5 | 5.3 | 0.7 | 83.5 | 80.7 | 86.3 | 5.6 | −0.1 | 83.4 | 80.7 | 86.1 | 5.4 | 0.6 |
| ES43 | Extremadura | 82.7 | 79.8 | 85.7 | 5.9 | 0.4 | 83.1 | 80.2 | 86.2 | 6.0 | 0.2 | 83.3 | 80.7 | 86.0 | 5.3 | 0.6 |
| ES12 | Asturias | 82.5 | 79.2 | 85.6 | 6.4 | 0.7 | 83.2 | 80.1 | 86.2 | 6.1 | 0.1 | 83.3 | 80.4 | 85.9 | 5.5 | 0.8 |
| ES62 | Murcia | 82.8 | 80.3 | 85.3 | 5.0 | 0.1 | 82.9 | 80.3 | 85.4 | 5.1 | 0.1 | 83.0 | 80.5 | 85.6 | 5.1 | 0.2 |
| ES70 | Canary Islands (in the Atlantic Ocean) | 82.5 | 79.8 | 85.2 | 5.4 | 1.0 | 83.5 | 80.9 | 86.2 | 5.3 | −0.7 | 82.8 | 80.2 | 85.4 | 5.2 | 0.3 |
| ES61 | Andalusia | 82.1 | 79.2 | 84.9 | 5.7 | 0.5 | 82.6 | 79.8 | 85.3 | 5.5 | 0.1 | 82.7 | 80.0 | 85.4 | 5.4 | 0.6 |
| ES64 | Melilla (autonomous city in Africa) | 80.7 | 77.9 | 83.5 | 5.6 | 0.7 | 81.4 | 78.8 | 84.1 | 5.3 | 0.2 | 81.6 | 80.1 | 83.3 | 3.2 | 0.9 |
| ES63 | Ceuta (autonomous city in Africa) | 80.6 | 77.7 | 84.0 | 6.3 | 0.8 | 81.4 | 79.0 | 83.9 | 4.9 | −0.1 | 81.3 | 78.9 | 83.6 | 4.7 | 0.7 |

Data source: Eurostat

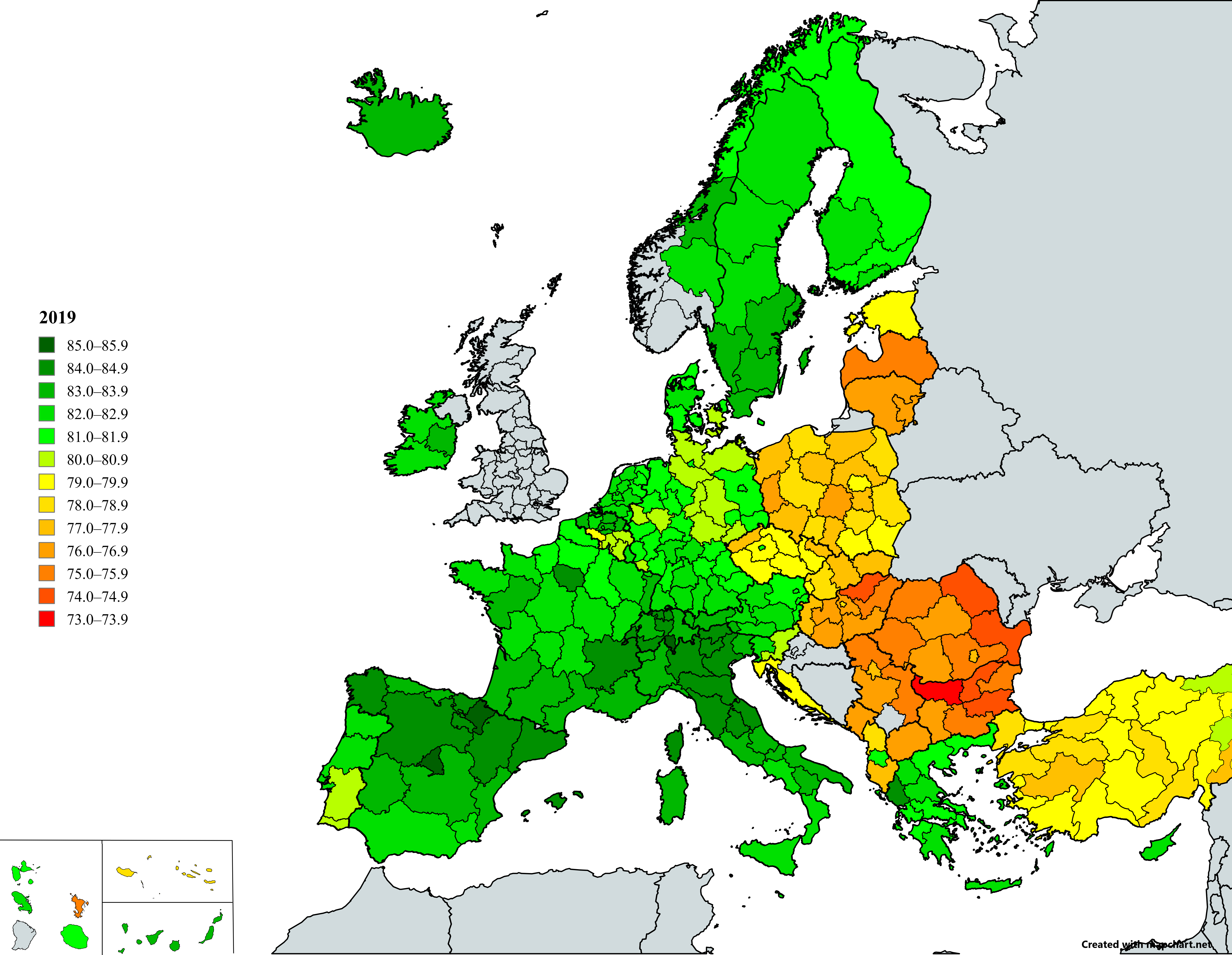
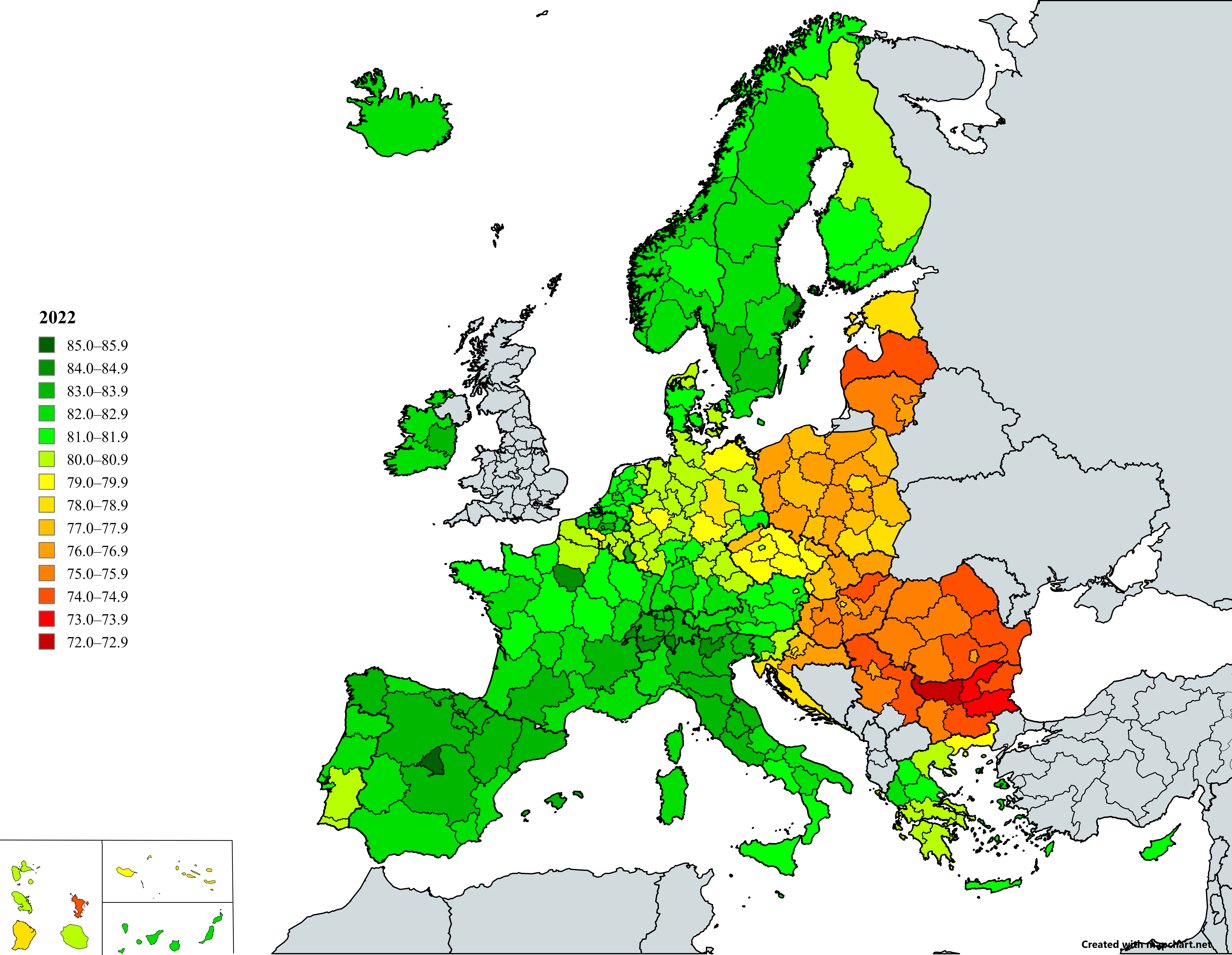
Life expectancy in Spanish regions in comparison with regions of other European countries in 2019 and 2022, according to Eurostat
(legends on the maps are identical)

== Global Data Lab (2019–2022) ==
| region | 2019 | | | | 2019 →2021 | 2021 | 2021 →2022 | 2022 | | | | 2019 →2022 |
| region | overall | male | female | F Δ M | 2019 →2021 | overall | 2021 →2022 | overall | male | female | F Δ M | 2019 →2022 |
|---|---|---|---|---|---|---|---|---|---|---|---|---|
| Spain on average | 83.53 | 80.82 | 86.17 | 5.35 | −0.52 | 83.01 | 0.90 | 83.91 | 81.20 | 86.55 | 5.35 | 0.38 |
| Madrid | 85.34 | 82.66 | 87.65 | 4.99 | −0.31 | 85.03 | 0.85 | 85.88 | 83.10 | 88.33 | 5.23 | 0.54 |
| Navarre | 84.55 | 82.06 | 86.96 | 4.90 | −0.12 | 84.43 | 0.14 | 84.57 | 81.68 | 87.52 | 5.84 | 0.02 |
| Castile and León | 84.25 | 81.47 | 87.06 | 5.59 | −0.32 | 83.93 | 0.54 | 84.47 | 81.68 | 87.32 | 5.64 | 0.22 |
| Catalonia | 83.85 | 80.97 | 86.56 | 5.59 | −0.51 | 83.34 | 1.03 | 84.37 | 81.58 | 87.02 | 5.44 | 0.52 |
| Basque Country | 84.05 | 81.07 | 86.96 | 5.89 | −0.42 | 83.63 | 0.64 | 84.27 | 81.48 | 87.02 | 5.54 | 0.22 |
| Castilla–La Mancha | 83.45 | 81.17 | 85.96 | 4.79 | −0.51 | 82.94 | 1.13 | 84.07 | 81.68 | 86.61 | 4.93 | 0.62 |
| Galicia | 83.55 | 80.67 | 86.46 | 5.79 | −0.02 | 83.53 | 0.54 | 84.07 | 81.18 | 86.82 | 5.64 | 0.52 |
| Balearic Islands (in the Mediterranean Sea) | 83.75 | 81.37 | 86.06 | 4.69 | −0.41 | 83.34 | 0.53 | 83.87 | 81.18 | 86.51 | 5.33 | 0.12 |
| La Rioja | 83.75 | 80.97 | 86.56 | 5.59 | −0.81 | 82.94 | 0.93 | 83.87 | 81.08 | 86.71 | 5.63 | 0.12 |
| Cantabria | 83.45 | 80.77 | 86.16 | 5.39 | 0.18 | 83.63 | 0.14 | 83.77 | 81.08 | 86.21 | 5.13 | 0.32 |
| Aragon | 83.95 | 81.17 | 86.66 | 5.49 | −0.81 | 83.14 | 0.53 | 83.67 | 80.88 | 86.51 | 5.63 | −0.28 |
| Valencia | 83.06 | 80.37 | 85.76 | 5.39 | −0.92 | 82.14 | 1.12 | 83.26 | 80.68 | 85.91 | 5.23 | 0.20 |
| Extremadura | 82.66 | 79.87 | 85.66 | 5.79 | −0.72 | 81.94 | 1.22 | 83.16 | 80.47 | 85.81 | 5.34 | 0.50 |
| Asturias | 82.76 | 79.77 | 85.66 | 5.89 | −0.12 | 82.64 | 0.52 | 83.16 | 80.37 | 85.81 | 5.44 | 0.40 |
| Canary Islands (in the Atlantic Ocean) | 83.06 | 80.57 | 85.66 | 5.09 | −0.22 | 82.84 | 0.12 | 82.96 | 80.47 | 85.51 | 5.04 | −0.10 |
| Murcia | 82.46 | 79.97 | 84.87 | 4.90 | −0.52 | 81.94 | 0.82 | 82.76 | 80.07 | 85.51 | 5.44 | 0.30 |
| Andalusia | 82.16 | 79.47 | 84.77 | 5.30 | −0.82 | 81.34 | 1.32 | 82.66 | 79.97 | 85.30 | 5.33 | 0.50 |
| Melilla (autonomous city in Africa) | 80.97 | 78.48 | 83.58 | 5.10 | −1.22 | 79.75 | 2.61 | 82.36 | 80.37 | 84.40 | 4.03 | 1.39 |
| Ceuta (autonomous city in Africa) | 80.97 | 78.68 | 83.38 | 4.70 | −2.21 | 78.76 | 2.29 | 81.05 | 79.26 | 82.79 | 3.53 | 0.08 |

Data source: Global Data Lab

== Probability of dying, 2022–2024 ==
The probability of dying is a statistical indicator that shows the proportion of people who die at a given age to those who have reached that age. Strictly speaking, this is not a probability, but a frequency of deaths.

The table shows average values for Spain for the period 2022—2024. The National Statistics Institute of Spain publishes data only up to age of 99, that is insufficient to estimate the slowdown in acceleration of mortality at later ages for this country.

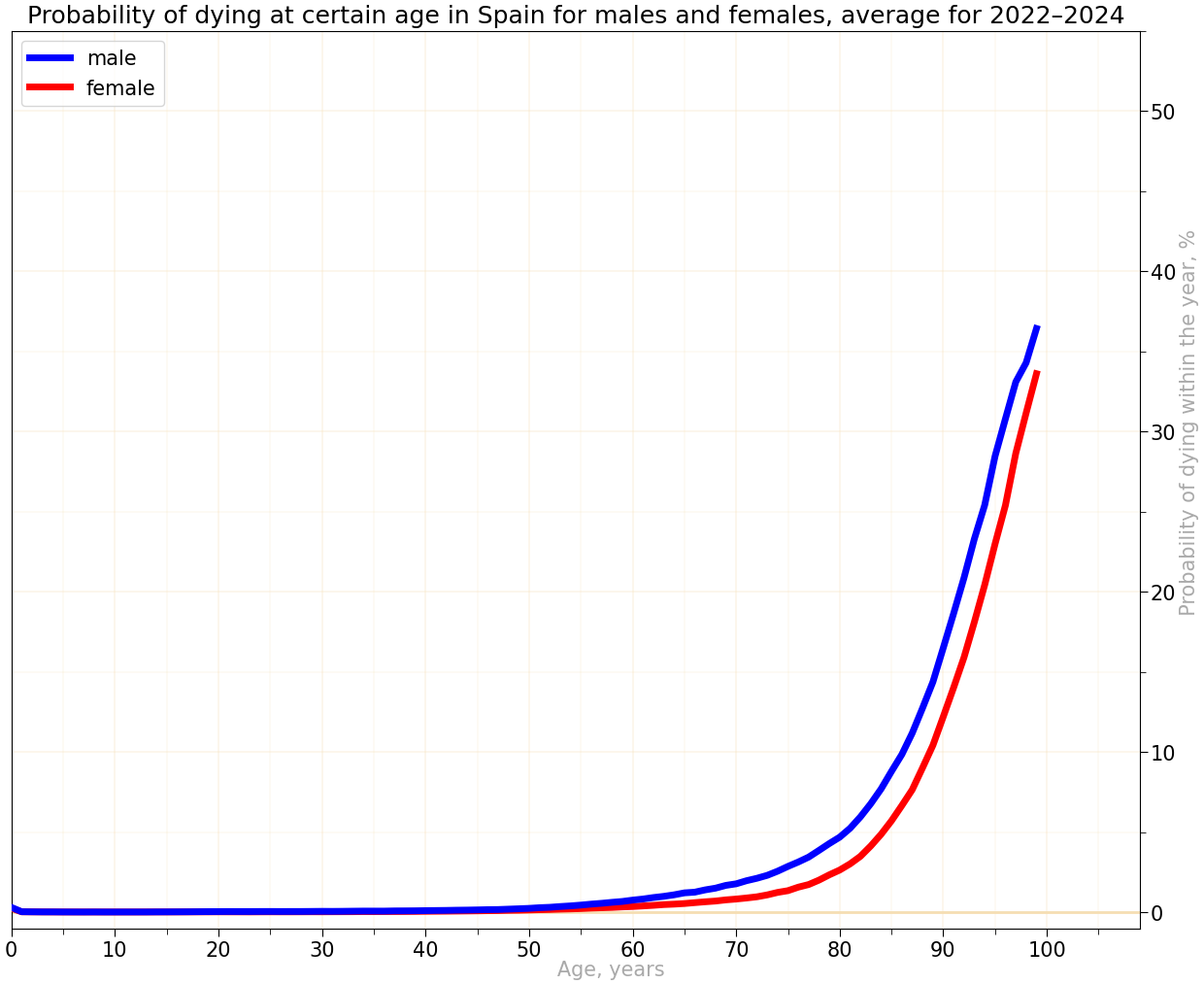
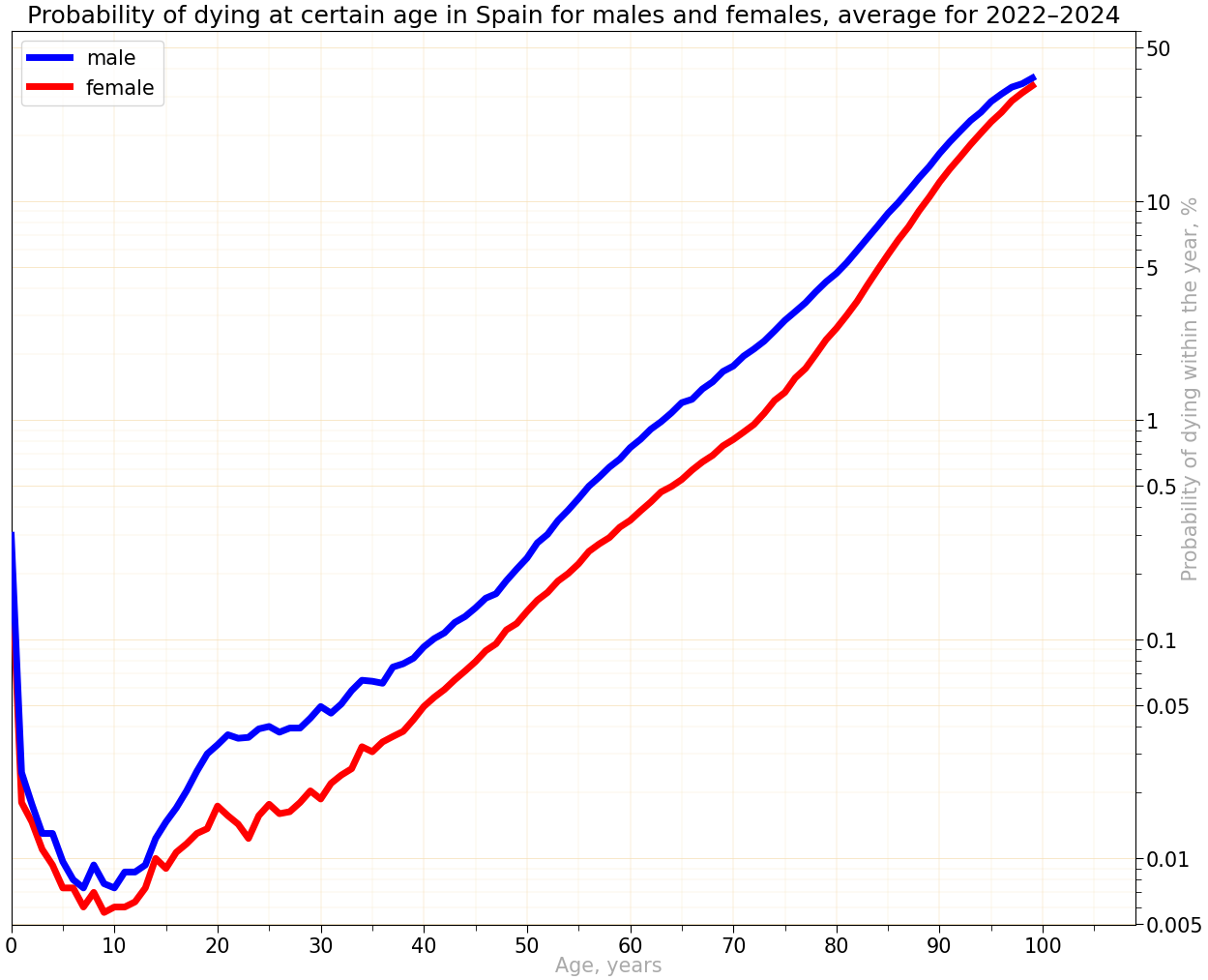
According chart of the probability of dying in Spain for male and female. The chart is made in two versions: using linear and logarithmic scales.
The probability of dying between ages of 40 and 90 doubles every 6.8 years for male and 6.7 years for female.

| Age | Probability of dying, % | | M / F |
| Age | male | female | M / F |
|---|---|---|---|
| 0 | 0.298 | 0.244 | 1.22 |
| 1 | 0.025 | 0.018 | 1.37 |
| 5 | 0.010 | 0.007 | 1.32 |
| 10 | 0.007 | 0.006 | 1.22 |
| 15 | 0.015 | 0.009 | 1.63 |
| 20 | 0.033 | 0.017 | 1.90 |
| 25 | 0.040 | 0.018 | 2.26 |
| 30 | 0.049 | 0.019 | 2.64 |
| 35 | 0.064 | 0.031 | 2.10 |
| 40 | 0.092 | 0.049 | 1.87 |
| 45 | 0.139 | 0.079 | 1.76 |
| 50 | 0.235 | 0.134 | 1.75 |
| 55 | 0.439 | 0.221 | 1.99 |
| 60 | 0.749 | 0.349 | 2.15 |
| 65 | 1.201 | 0.536 | 2.24 |
| 70 | 1.766 | 0.816 | 2.17 |
| 75 | 2.852 | 1.338 | 2.13 |
| 80 | 4.678 | 2.625 | 1.78 |
| 85 | 8.784 | 5.699 | 1.54 |
| 90 | 16.490 | 12.195 | 1.35 |
| 95 | 28.447 | 22.973 | 1.24 |
| 99 | 36.413 | 33.594 | 1.08 |

Data source: National Statistics Institute (Spain) (Instituto Nacional de Estadística)

== Charts ==
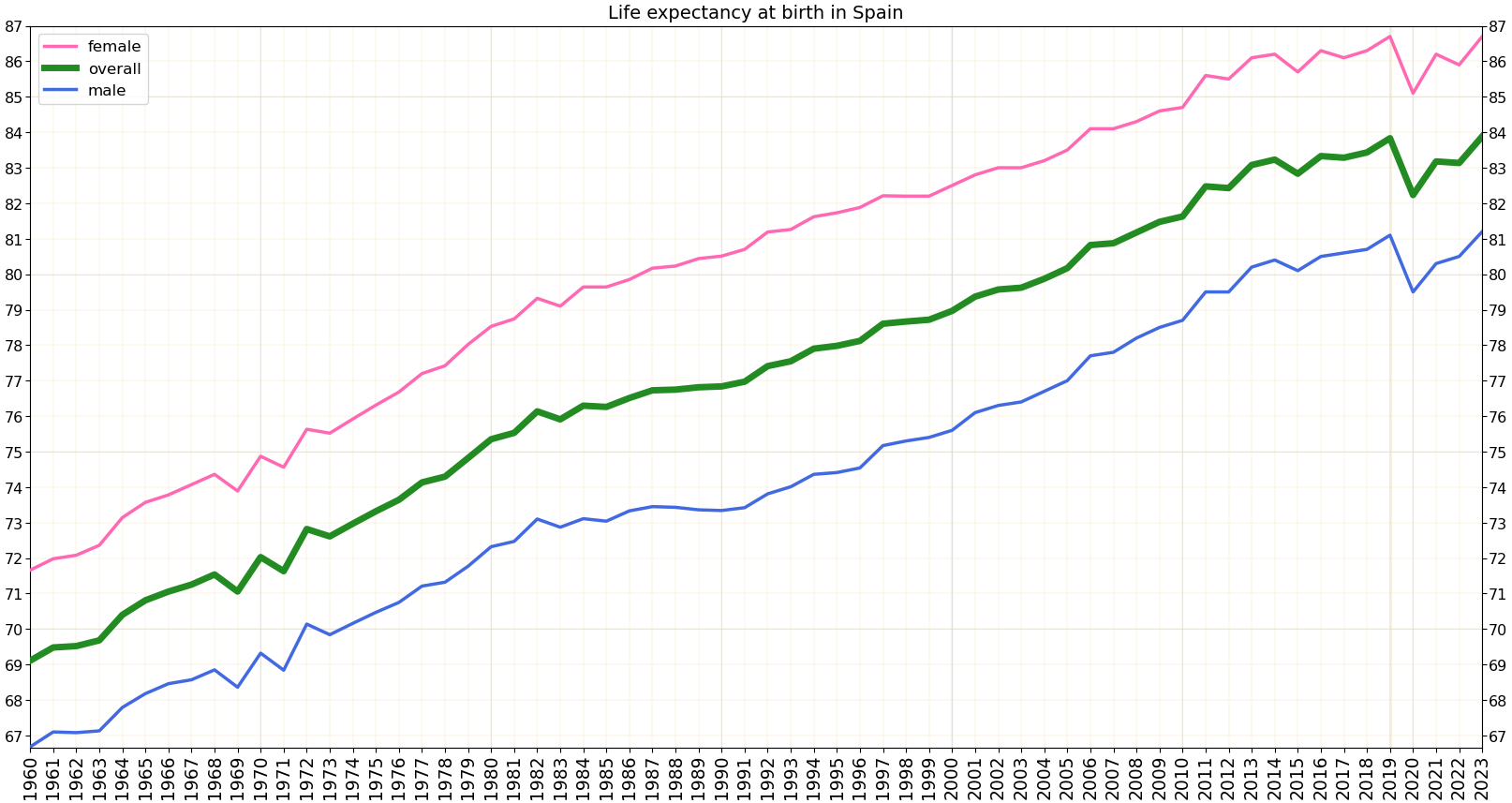
Development of life expectancy in Spain according to estimation of the World Bank Group

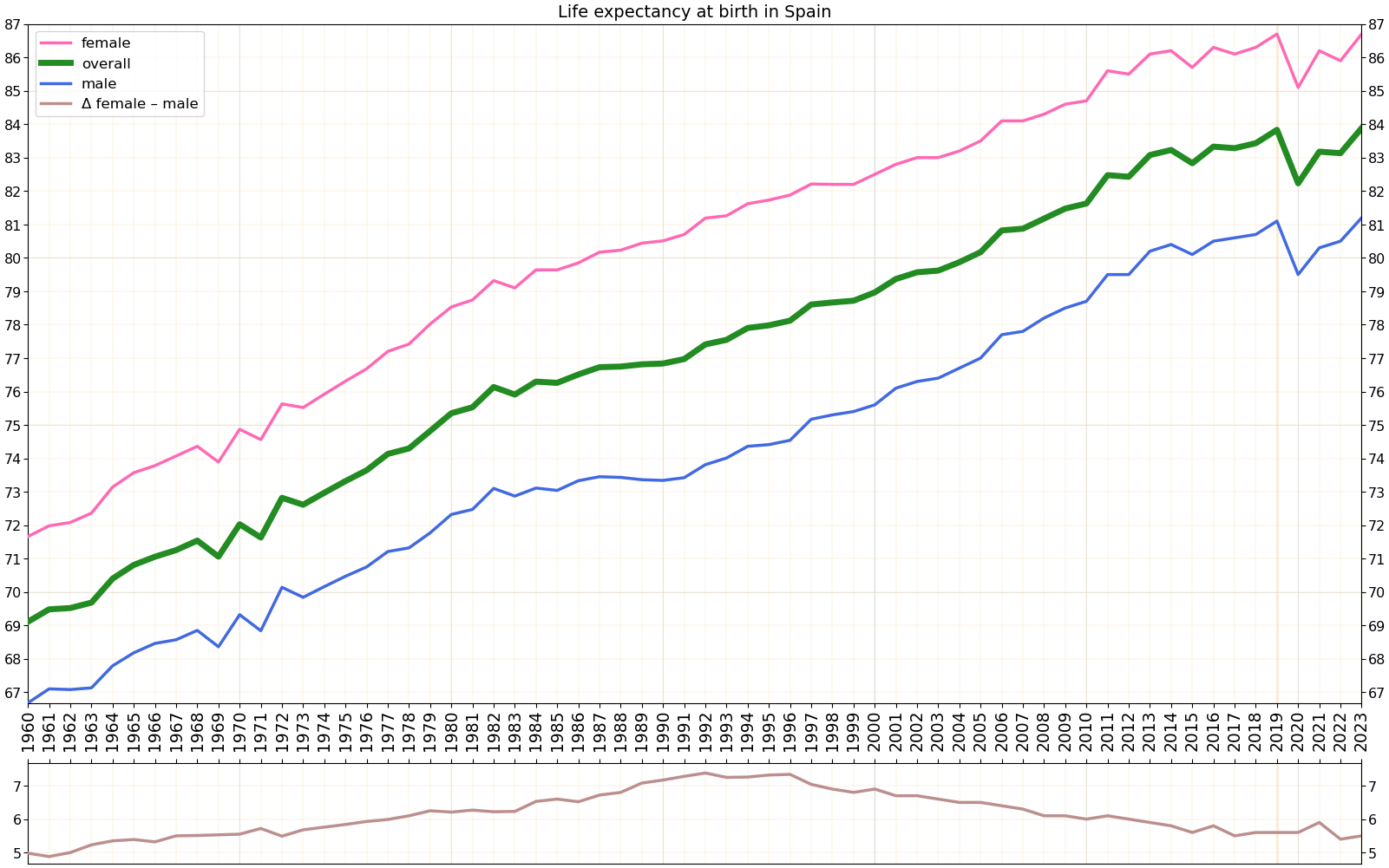
Life expectancy with calculated sex gap

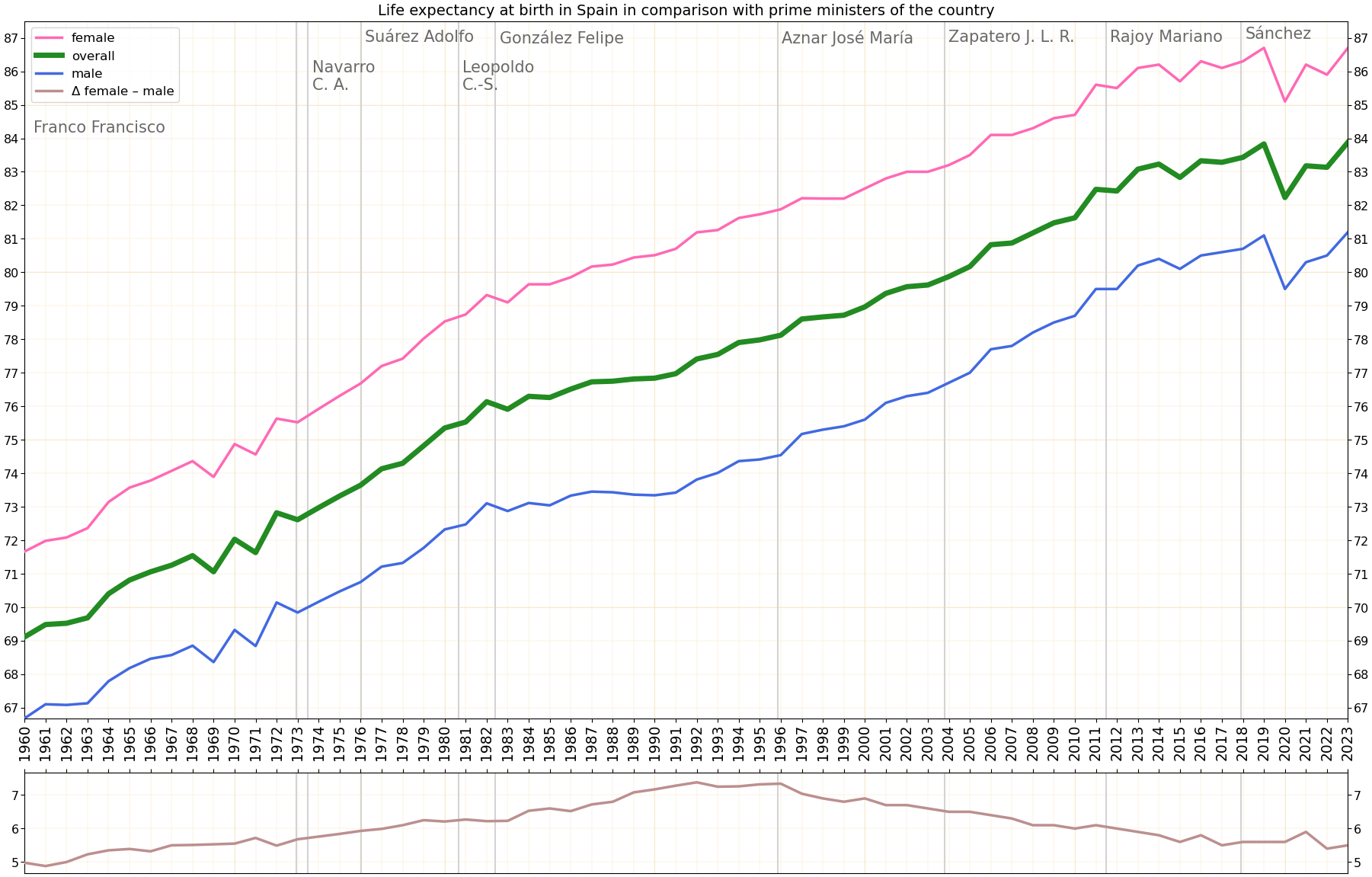
Life expectancy in comparison to prime ministers of the country

Life expectancy in Spain according to estimation of Our World in Data

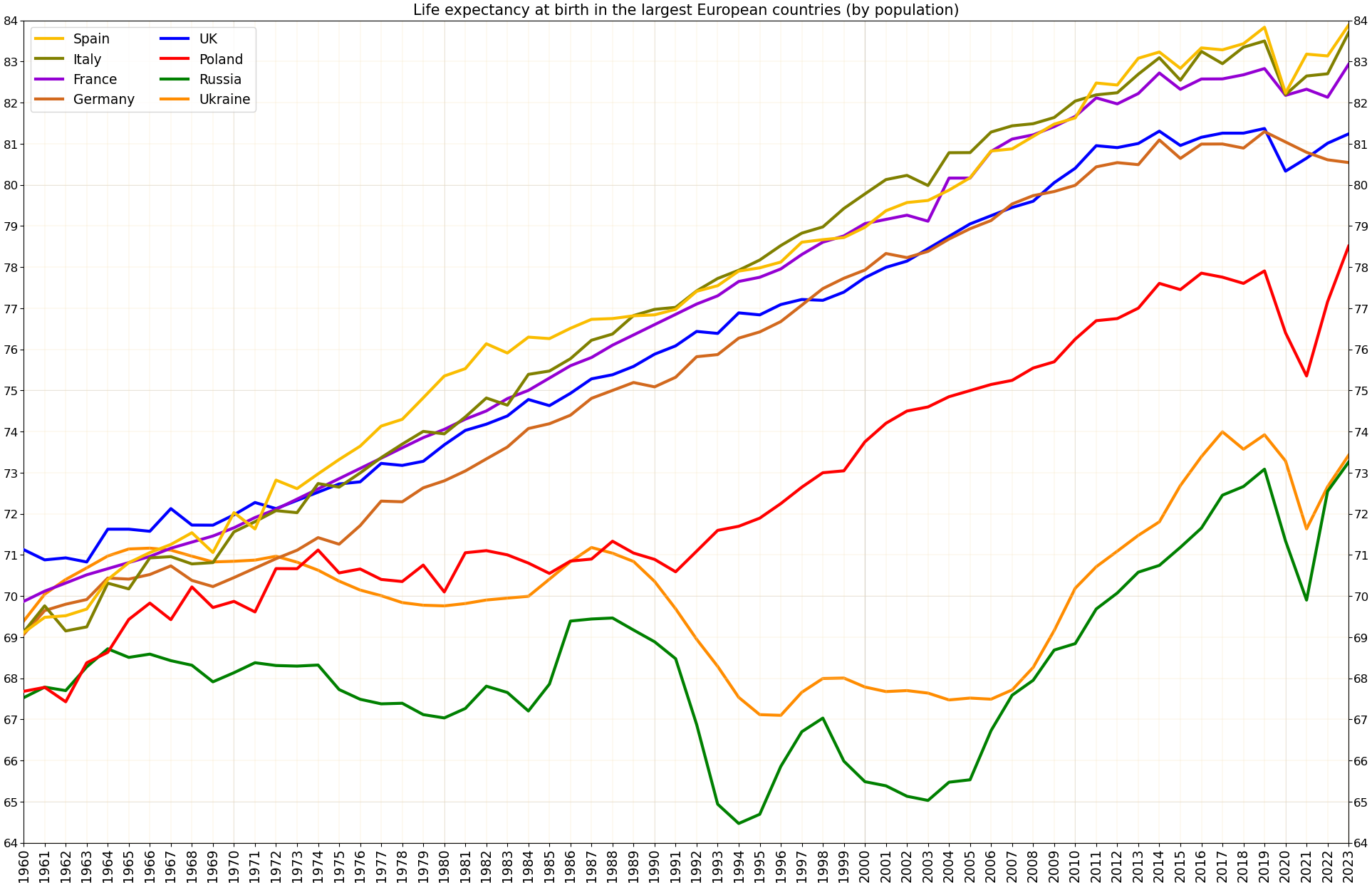
Development of life expectancy in Spain in comparison to the largest by population European countries

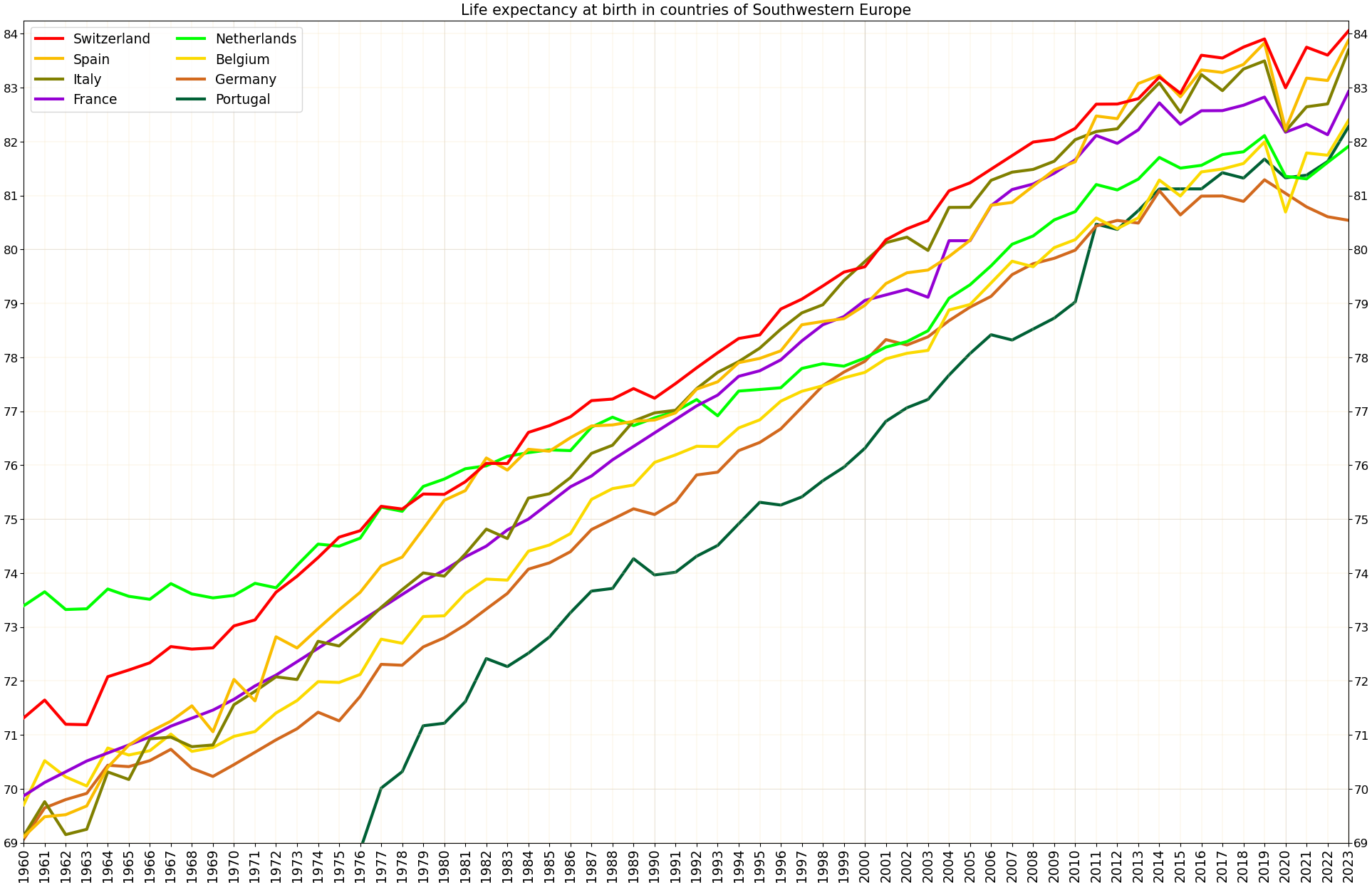
Development of life expectancy in Spain in comparison to neighboring countries
Life expectancy and healthy life expectancy in Spain on the background of other countries of the world in 2019

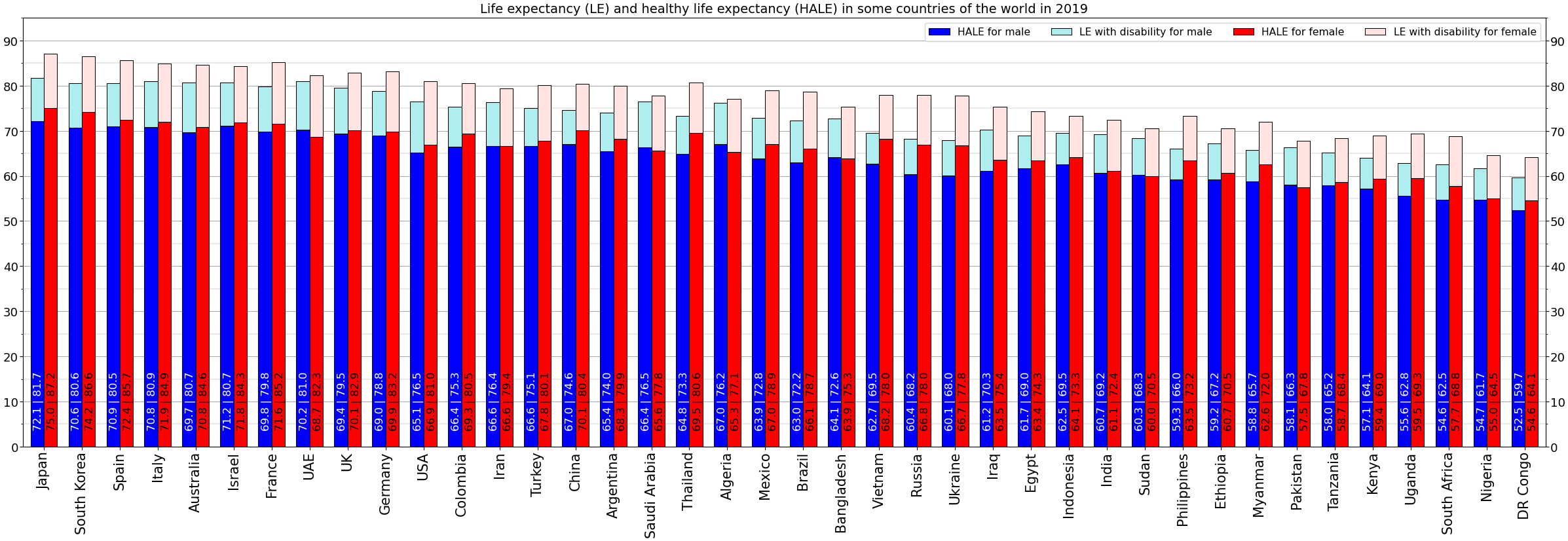
Life expectancy and healthy life expectancy for males and females separately
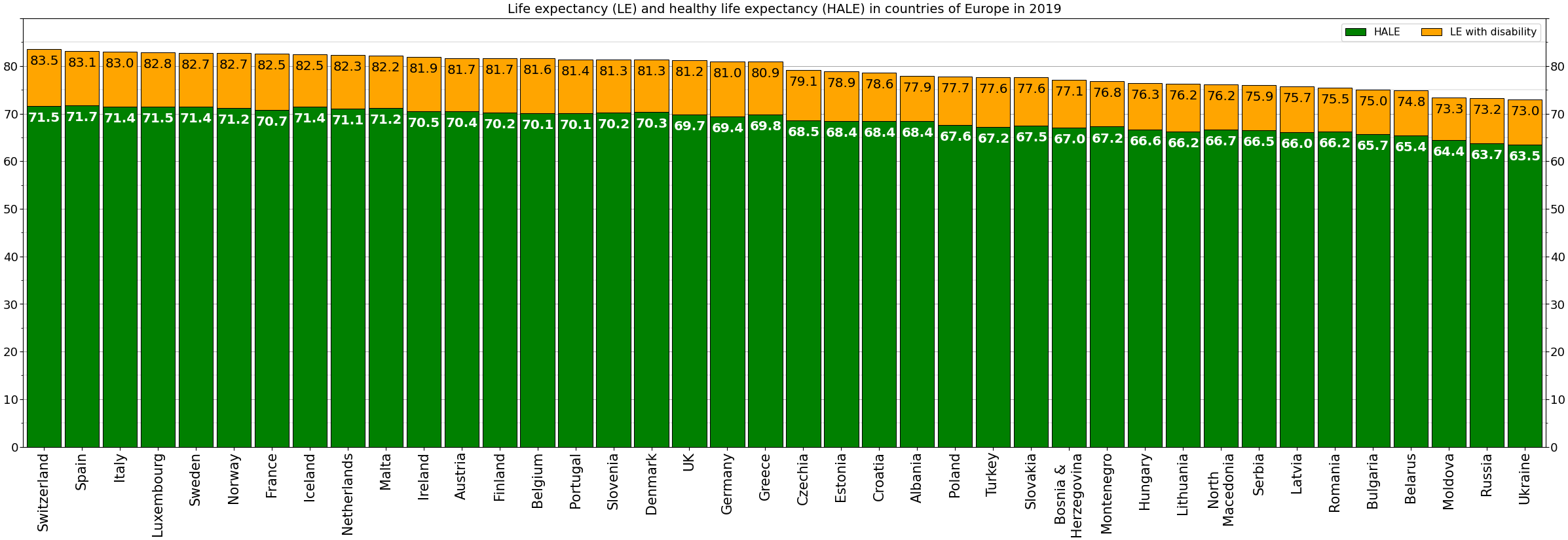
Life expectancy and healthy life expectancy in Spain on the background of other countries of Europe in 2019

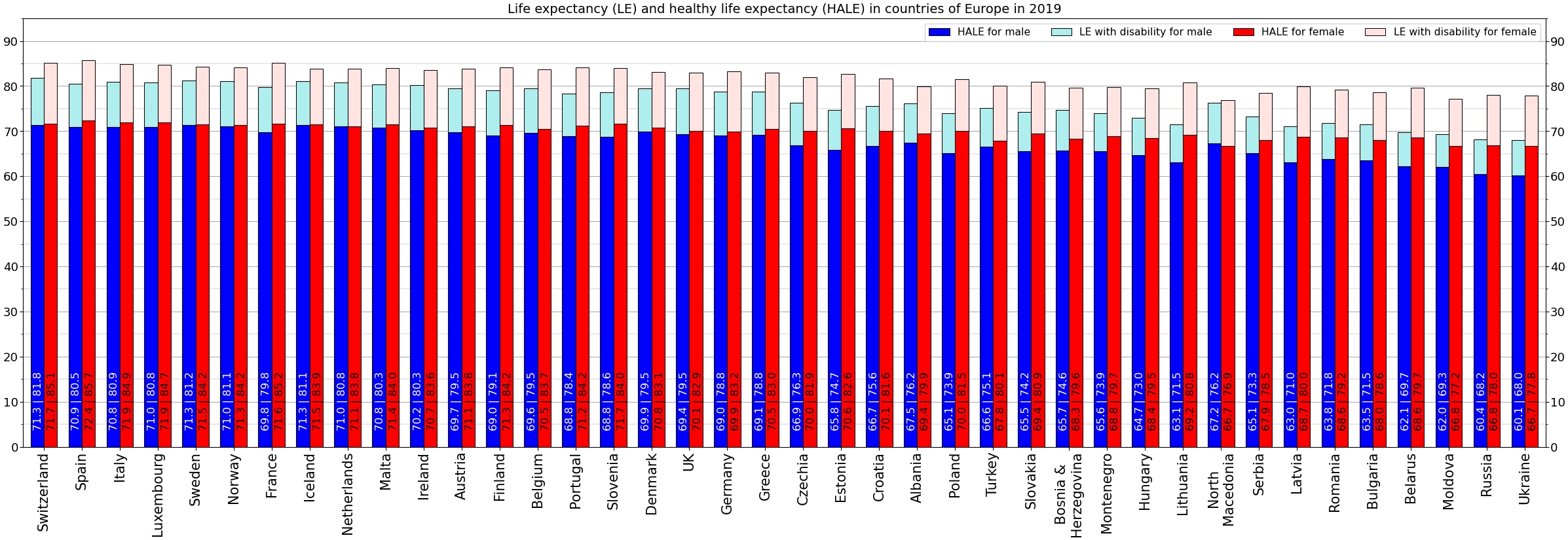
Life expectancy and healthy life expectancy for males and females separately

== See also ==
- List of countries by life expectancy
- List of European countries by life expectancy
- Demographics of Spain
