= Excess mortality =

Public health measurements

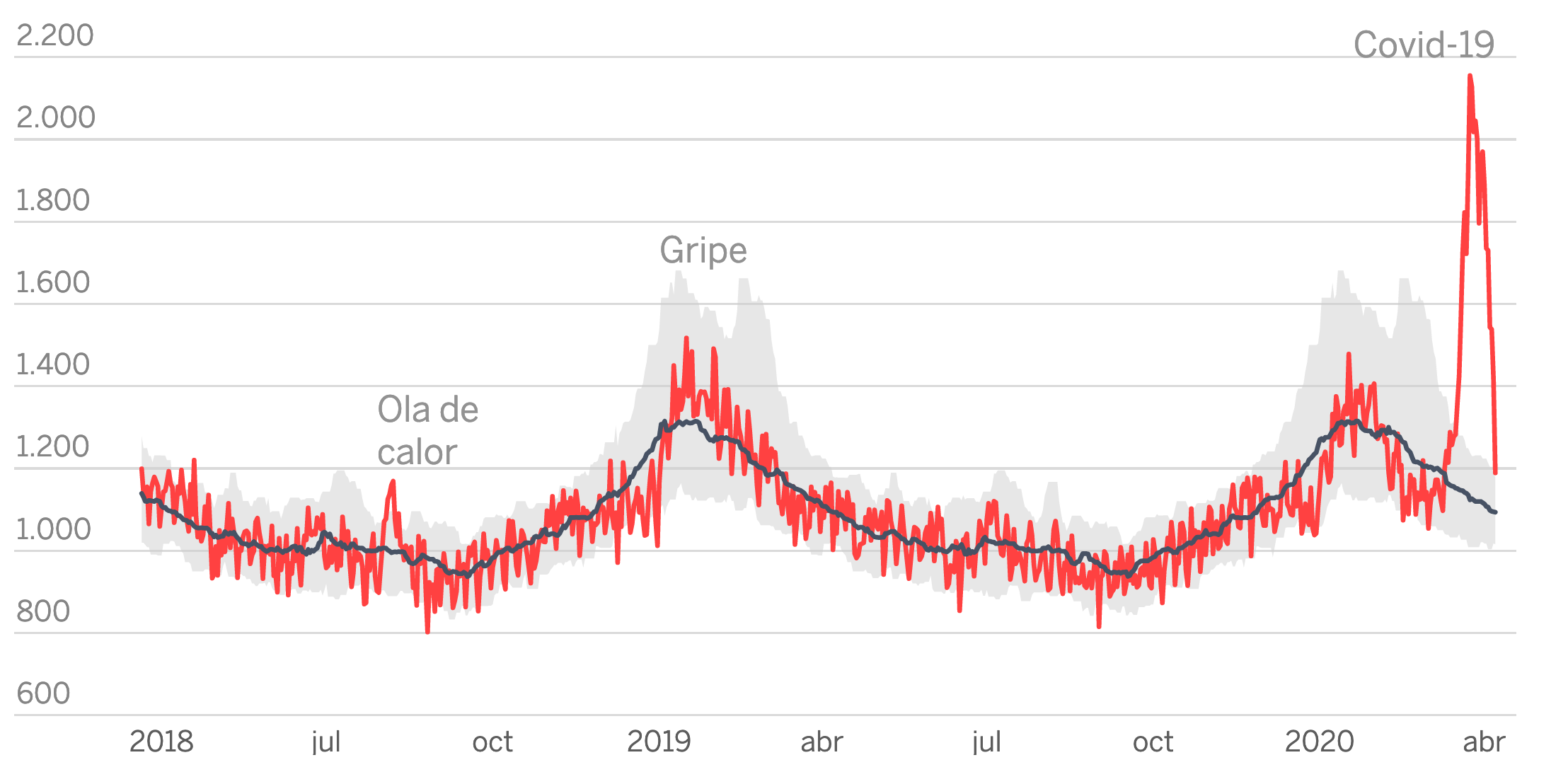
The COVID-19 pandemic in Spain caused significant excess mortality (expected rate in black, with confidence intervals in gray). Reporting lags lead to undercounting in the latest (rightmost) data.

In epidemiology, the excess deaths or excess mortality is a measure of the increase in the number of deaths during a time period and/or in a certain group, as compared to the expected value or statistical trend during a reference period (typically of five years) or in a reference population. It may typically be measured in percentage points, or in number of deaths per time unit.

A short period of excess mortality that is followed by a compensating period of mortality deficit (i.e., fewer deaths than expected, because those people have died at a younger age) is quite common, and is also known as "harvesting". Mortality deficit in a particular time period can be caused by deaths displaced to an earlier time (due to harvesting by an event in the past) or deaths displaced to a future time (due to lives being saved, also called "avoided mortality").

Mortality displacement is the occurrence of deaths at an earlier time than they would have otherwise occurred, meaning the deaths are displaced from the future into the present, resulting in a changed life expectancy.

As opposed to number of registered fatalities of a certain death cause, such as a specific virus, a temporary excess mortality, and the mortality displacement, are measures that reflect many combined causes. The dominant reason may be events such as heat waves, cold spells, epidemics and pandemics (especially influenza pandemics), famine or war, and allows for estimates of the mortality caused by those events combined with other indirect health effects. Excess mortality may also be calculated for particular subgroups, such as by age, race, or gender.

== Measurement ==
Different institutions and initiatives offer weekly data to monitor excess mortality. Significant efforts to capture short term mortality data have been made along 2020 due to the pandemic of the coronavirus disease 2019 (COVID-19) and its worldwide effects. Eurostat launched in April 2020 a collection of weekly death data that provide for most of the EU countries weekly death data series by 5-year age groups and sex in NUTS3 regions within the countries starting from the year 2000. This temporary data collection was established in order to support the policy and research efforts related to the COVID-19 pandemic. Data are transmitted by the National Statistical Institutes on voluntary basis and it is being updated, depending on the country, weekly.

In May 2020, the Human Mortality Database project launched a new data series, the Short-term Mortality Fluctuation series (STMF), offering freely available weekly death counts by age and sex for a growing number of countries (34 in October 2020), as well as a visualization tool that captures the excess mortality on a weekly basis. The STMF was established to provide data for scientific analysis of all-cause mortality fluctuations by week within each calendar year in standard formats. Part of the Human Mortality Database use a joint project of two teams based in the Laboratory of Demographic Data at the Max Planck Institute for Demographic Research (MPIDR) and at the Department of Demography of the University of California, Berkeley (UCB).

The collaborative network EuroMOMO (European mortality monitoring activity), monitors mortality across 24 European countries in order to detect and measure excess deaths related to seasonal influenza, pandemics, and other public health threats. EuroMOMO is hosted and maintained by the Department of Infectious Disease Epidemiology and Prevention of Copenhagen, Denmark. They offer regular reports (weekly bulletins), graphs and maps showing the present levels of mortality but the network does not publish openly data. Individual partners may decide to share openly some selected national data, like for instance, MoMo-Spain. The study centre at the Statens Serum Institut in Copenhagen publishes a weekly situation report and regular scientific articles. Periods of high excess mortality have also been described for the United States.

== Causes ==
=== Heat waves ===
During heat waves, there are often additional deaths observed in the population, affecting especially older adults and those who are sick. After some periods with excess mortality, however, there has also been observed a decrease in overall mortality during the subsequent weeks. Such short-term forward shift in mortality rate is also referred to as harvesting effect. The subsequent, compensatory reduction in mortality suggests that the heat wave especially affected those whose health was already so compromised that they "would have died in the short-term anyway" due to other causes, meaning that not all the deaths caused by the heat wave could have been avoided by addressing the effects of heat waves.

During the 2026 European heatwaves, the World Health Organization said that more than 1,300 excess deaths linked to high temperatures had been recorded across Europe in a week.

=== COVID ===
Although reported COVID-19 deaths between Jan 1, 2020, and Dec 31, 2021, totalled 5.9 million worldwide, researchers published in The Lancet estimated that 18.2 million people died worldwide because of the COVID-19 pandemic over that period. Other researchers reported similar effects, e.g. 14.8 million excess deaths globally, 2.7 times more deaths than the 5.4 million reported as due to COVID-19 for the period 2020-2021.
