= Roger Thatcher =

British statistician (1926–2010)

- Roger Thatcher
- Born: Arthur Roger Thatcher; 22 October 1926; Birmingham, Warwickshire, England
- Died: 13 February 2010 (aged 83); UK
- Other name: A. Roger Thatcher
- Education: The Leys School; St John's College, Cambridge
- Occupation: Statistician
- Years active: 1952–2010
- Known for: Registrar general for England and Wales and the Director of the Office of Population Censuses and Surveys
- Notable work: Kannisto-Thatcher Database on Old Age Mortality
- Spouse: Mary

Arthur Roger Thatcher CB (22 October 1926 – 13 February 2010) was a British statistician. Thatcher was born in Birmingham and spent his formative early years in Wilmslow, Cheshire. He attended The Leys School in Cambridge and went on to university at St John's College, Cambridge, where he concentrated his studies in statistics, economics, and mathematics. After brief training in meteorology as part of his national service, he instructed Royal Navy pilots in weather patterns. He married his wife Mary in 1950; they had two children.

He served in the North Western Gas Board before moving into the area of government statistics in 1952. He worked for the Admiralty and then Central Statistics Office, where under Lionel Robbins he worked on the Robbins Report. By 1971 he was deputy director of statistics for the Ministry of Labour, and wrote British Labour Statistics: Historical Abstract 1886–1968. He became director of the Department of Employment and Productivity, serving under leaders including William Whitelaw, 1st Viscount Whitelaw, Barbara Castle, Baroness Castle of Blackburn, and Michael Foot.

He became registrar general for England and Wales and the director of the Office of Population Censuses and Surveys in 1978. He worked on the 1981 census in the United Kingdom and reported directly to Prime Minister of the United Kingdom Margaret Thatcher, who had him remove three questions from the census to trim it down. He became interested in research into centenarians in this role, and found in 1981 that their numbers in the United Kingdom had increased significantly from prior 1971 data. He served as director at the Office of Population Censuses and Surveys until 1986.

Thatcher compiled research into population data and centenarians and contributed a significant body of scholarly work in addition to his government statistics duties. He predicted a good number of those born during the post–World War II baby boom would live beyond the age of 116. His work on the Kannisto-Thatcher Database on Old Age Mortality is held by the Max Planck Institute for Demographic Research and regarded as one of its most vital collections. The Journal of the Royal Statistical Society called him one of the "stalwarts" within the field of statistics. He died in 2010 at the age of 83, and remained active within his field of academia corresponding with other scholars until shortly before his death.

== Early life and family ==
He was born as Arthur Roger Thatcher on 22 October 1926 in Birmingham to Arthur Thatcher and Edith (née Dobson). Thatcher spent his formative years in Wilmslow, Cheshire. He attended The Leys School in Cambridge for his secondary education. He went on to attend St John's College, Cambridge, and while there focused his academic concentration on the three areas of statistics, economics, and mathematics. By his third-year of studies at the college in 1946, he had attained high honours. He was mobilised as part of national service, instructed briefly in meteorology, and went to assist pilots in the Royal Navy with weather analysis. In 1950 he married his wife Mary; they subsequently had two children: Susan and Jill.

== Statistics career ==
=== Government service ===
Subsequent to his departure from national service, Thatcher was hired by the North Western Gas Board. He transferred from this agency to government statistics in 1952, and was first employed by the Admiralty and then afterwards by the Central Statistics Office two years later. He worked on the Robbins Report under Lionel Robbins while in this office, compiling information about higher education.

Thatcher served as deputy director of statistics for the Ministry of Labour, where in 1971 he put together the original version of the publication, British Labour Statistics: Historical Abstract 1886–1968. Under the newly formed version of the same agency in 1968, subsequently titled the Department of Employment and Productivity, Thatcher served as director. In this role he worked under agency leaders including William Whitelaw, 1st Viscount Whitelaw, Barbara Castle, Baroness Castle of Blackburn, and Michael Foot.

In 1978, Thatcher became registrar general for England and Wales and the director of the Office of Population Censuses and Surveys. His work on the 1981 census in the United Kingdom in this role proved to be a difficult task, primarily due to the sheer size of total effort required for the operation. Thatcher was required to delete three queries from the census after personally meeting to discuss the matter with then-Prime Minister of the United Kingdom Margaret Thatcher. In 1981, Thatcher found that over the prior thirty-year-period, the number of individuals alive to reach the age of 100 had increased by a figure of sixfold. At a 1981 meeting in Sussex held by the Medical Journalists Association, Thatcher presented the findings from his research and called the results "spectacular". He reported that in 1971 there were less than 300 people in the United Kingdom over 100 years of age, and that this number had risen to 1800 total people of the same age range by 1981. Thatcher served as director of the Office of Population Censuses and Surveys until 1986.

=== Population research ===
He subsequently was drawn into researching discrepancies between the 1981 census and a prior version completed in 1971, specifically on data involving centenarians. During the course of this research, he found that there was a lack of study regarding the well-being of centenarians in the United Kingdom. Thatcher posited that the increase in longevity amongst those individuals that actually get to one-hundred was likely attributable to lack of stress in these older years. Thatcher found that contributing factors towards this progress in longevity also included better overall healthcare and an ever-increasing total population size in general. According to his research, Thatcher predicted that in the decade of the 2080s, each year the United Kingdom would see one individual reach the age of 116. He asserted that a fair number of individuals born between the 1950s–1960s attributed to the post–World War II baby boom would see a life expectancy age range between 116 and 123 total years.

In addition to his roles within government Thatcher contributed to the field of statistics through writings collaborated upon with other academics. His 1983 article "How Many People Have Ever Lived On Earth?", a publication of the International Statistical Institute, disproved the notion that the number of people living in the 20th century was in actuality much less than the total number of individuals previously in existence. His work on the Kannisto-Thatcher Database on Old Age Mortality is held by the Max Planck Institute for Demographic Research and regarded as one of its most vital collections. The database contains information from over 30 sovereign states on mortality and population size for males and females older than the age of 80. Their research was entered into computer format by the medical school at Odense University in the early part of the 1990s. Academic scholars James Vaupel and Väinö Kannisto helped him co-author the book The Force of Mortality at Ages 80 to 120, which was first published in 1998. Writing in the Journal of the Royal Statistical Society in 2000, Douglas Liddell placed Thatcher amongst "stalwarts" within the field of statistics, and compared him to others influential within the field including fellow statistician Michael Healy.

== Death ==
Thatcher remained active within the field of statistics throughout his old age, communicating with academics in Asia, the United States, and Europe. Until the day he died, he was enthusiastically involved in research within the field of demographics. He died at the age of 83 on 13 February 2010. He was outlived by his wife and two children.

== See also ==
- Founders of statistics
- List of actuaries
- List of mathematical probabilists
- List of mathematicians
- List of statisticians
