= Demographics of the European Union =

- Map showing the population density by NUTS3 region, 2017, including non-EU countries
- Population: 451,990,314 (2026)
- Growth rate: 0.43% (2023)
- Birth rate: 8.7 births per 1,000 (2022)
- Death rate: 11.5 deaths per 1,000 (2022)
- Life expectancy: 81.5 (2023)
  - male: 77.9 years (2022)
  - female: 83.3 years (2022)
- Fertility rate: 1.46 children per woman (2022)
- Infant mortality: 3.3 deaths per 1,000 live births (2022)

Language
- Official: See languages of the European Union
- Spoken: Most spoken L1: German: 20% (2020) Most spoken L2: English L2: 43% (2017)

The demographics of the European Union show a highly populated, culturally diverse union of 27 member states. As of 1 January 2026, the population of the EU is just under 452 million.

== Population by country ==
The most populous member state is Germany, with an estimated 83.5 million people, and the least populous member state is Malta with 0.57 million. Birth rates in the EU are in the low range, with the average woman having 1.6 children. The highest birth rates are found in Ireland with 11.153 births per thousand people per year and in France with 10.862 births. Spain has the lowest birth rate in Europe with 7.816 births per thousand people per year.

The table below uses data from Eurostat. The following is the estimated population of the EU on 1 January 2026:

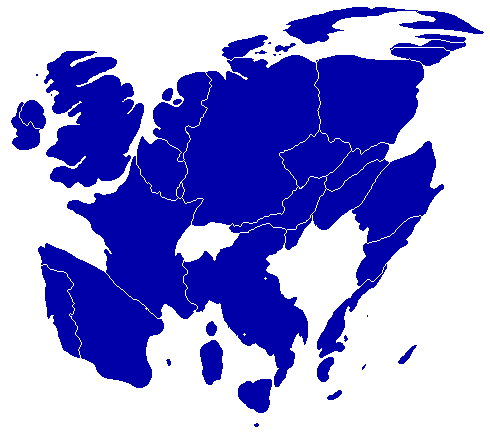
A cartogram depicting the population distribution between old EU-27 member states in 2008 (including the UK and excluding Croatia). 57.8% of all citizens of the EU live in the four largest member states: Germany, France, Italy, and Spain.

Member state	Population	Population (%)	Area (km^{2})	Area (%)	Density (/km^{2})
Austria	9,215,956	2.04%	83,878	2.0%	109
Belgium	11,955,308	2.65%	30,667	0.7%	383
Bulgaria	6,423,207	1.43%	110,996	2.6%	58
Croatia	3,876,002	0.86%	56,594	1.3%	68
Cyprus	996,571	0.22%	9,253	0.2%	100
Czech Republic	10,915,839	2.42%	78,871	1.9%	137
Denmark	6,025,603	1.33%	42,925	1.0%	138
Estonia	1,360,745	0.30%	45,336	1.1%	30
Finland	5,652,881	1.25%	338,411	8.0%	16
France	69,112,309	15.29%	638,475	15.1%	107
Germany	83,467,117	18.47%	357,569	8.5%	236
Greece	10,366,586	2.29%	131,694	3.1%	79
Hungary	9,488,428	2.10%	93,012	2.2%	103
Ireland	5,510,565	1.22%	69,947	1.7%	74
Italy	58,942,828	13.04%	302,079	7.1%	195
Latvia	1,845,096	0.41%	64,586	1.5%	29
Lithuania	2,887,592	0.64%	65,284	1.5%	44
Luxembourg	690,959	0.15%	2,595	0.1%	255
Malta	588,254	0.13%	316	0.01%	1715
Netherlands	18,130,208	4.01%	37,378	0.9%	477
Poland	36,332,765	8.04%	311,928	7.4%	118
Portugal	11,424,031	2.53%	92,227	2.2%	113
Romania	19,041,322	4.21%	238,398	5.6%	80
Slovakia	5,409,407	1.20%	49,035	1.2%	111
Slovenia	2,135,107	0.47%	20,273	0.5%	104
Spain	49,590,099	10.97%	505,983	12.0%	97
Sweden	10,605,529	2.35%	447,424	10.6%	24
European Union	451,990,314	100%	4,225,134	100%	106

== Demographic future ==
EU fertility has declined in the 2020s.

The EU faces challenges in its demographic future. Most concerns center around several related issues: an ageing population, growing life expectancy and immigrant flow.

After hitting a historical low of 1.47 children born per female, the total fertility rate of the EU started to increase again, to reach a level of 1.60 in 2008. The positive trend was observed in all member states with the exception of Luxembourg, Malta and Portugal. The largest increases over this period were observed in Bulgaria (from 1.23 children per woman in 2003 to 1.57 in 2009), Slovenia (from 1.20 to 1.53), the Czech Republic (from 1.18 to 1.49) and Lithuania (from 1.26 to 1.55). In 2009, the Member States with the highest fertility rates were Ireland (2.06), France (2.00), Sweden (1.94), and the United Kingdom (1.90), all approaching the replacement level of 2.1 children born per female. The lowest rates were observed in Latvia (1.31), Hungary and Portugal (both 1.32) and Germany (1.36). The increasing fertility rate has also been accompanied by an upward trend in the natural increase of the population which is due to the moderate increase of the crude birth rate that reached 10.9 births per 1000 inhabitants in 2008, an increase of 0.3 compared with 2007. The increase was observed in all member countries except Germany. The EU crude death rate remained stable at 9.7 per 1000 inhabitants. The relatively low fertility rate means retirement age workers are not entirely replaced by younger workers joining the workforce. The EU faces a potential future dominated by an ever-increasing population of retired citizens, without enough younger workers to fund (via taxes) retirement programs or other state welfare agendas.

A low fertility rate, without supplement from immigration, also suggests a declining overall EU population, which further suggests economic contraction or even a possible economic crisis. Some media have noted the 'baby crisis' in the EU, some governments have noted the problem, and the UN and other multinational authorities have warned of a possible crisis. At this point however such a decrease in the population of the EU is not observed as the overall natural growth remains positive and the EU continues to attract large numbers of immigrants. In 2010, a breakdown of the population by citizenship showed that there were 20.1 million foreign citizens living in the EU representing 4% of the population.

Over the last 50 years, life expectancy at birth in the EU27 has increased by around 10 years for both women and men, to reach 82.4 years for women and 76.4 years for men in 2008. The life expectancy at birth rose in all Member States, with the largest increases for both women and men recorded in Estonia and Slovenia.

=== Population projections ===
In 2017, Eurostat released yearly projections up to 2080.

The table figures below are in thousands.

Country	2015	2040	% change	2080	% change
(European Union) EU-28 (including UK)	508,401	528,357	3.9%	518,798	-2.0%
Austria	8,576	10,087	17.6%	10,072	17.4%
Belgium	11,208	12,844	14.6%	14,189	26.6%
Bulgaria	7,202	5,933	-17.6%	4,593	-36.2%
Cyprus	847	954	12.6%	1,004	18.5%
Czech Republic	10,538	10,552	0.1%	9,777	-7.2%
Denmark	5,659	6,564	16.0%	6,858	21.2%
Estonia	1,313	1,283	-2.3%	1,140	-13.2%
Finland	5,471	5,722	4.6%	5,577	1.9%
France	66,415	72,915	9.8%	78,688	18.5%
Germany	81,197	84,133	3.6%	77,793	-4.2%
Greece	10,858	9,419	-13.3%	7,264	-33.1%
Hungary	9,855	9,471	-3.9%	8,691	-11.8%
Ireland	4,628	5,396	16.6%	6,220	34.4%
Italy	60,795	59,982	-1.3%	53,784	-11.5%
Latvia	1,986	1,598	-19.5%	1,284	-35.3%
Lithuania	2,921	2,128	-27.1%	1,658	-43.2%
Luxembourg	562	860	53.0%	1,066	89.7%
Malta	429	505	17.7%	517	20.5%
Netherlands	16,900	19,035	12.6%	19,728	16.7%
Poland	38,005	35,840	-5.7%	29,044	-23.6%
Portugal	10,374	9,553	-7.9%	7,579	-26.9%
Romania	19,870	17,069	-14.0%	14,530	-26.8%
Slovakia	5,421	5,373	-0.9%	4,714	-13.0%
Slovenia	2,062	2,066	0.2%	1,938	-6.0%
Spain	46,449	48,244	3.9%	50,988	9.8%
Sweden	9,747	11,994	23.1%	14,388	47.6%

== Population shifts ==
Population pyramid of the EU 27 in 2023

The rate of natural change (births as opposed to deaths) was negative for the European Union as a whole in 2022: the population declined by 0.1 per cent per year without net migration. Of the most populous countries, particularly Italy (over -0.5 per cent) and Germany (roughly -0.4 per cent) saw a large natural population decrease. Only Malta, France, Sweden, Ireland, Luxembourg and Cyprus had "natural" population growth in 2022. Actual population growth, including migration, was nearly 0.4 per cent for the EU, however.

The overall population of the European Union continued to grow until 2020, but since 2021 it has fluctuated between decrease and increase in accordance with migration flows.

Country	Population (2026)	% growth (2024)	‰ Natural change (2024)	‰ Net migration (2022)	Fertility rate (2024)
European Union	451,990,314	0.24	-2.8	2.6	1.34
Germany	83,467,117	0.14	-4.0	15.4	1.36
France	69,112,309	0.25	0.3	2.7	1.61
Italy	58,942,828	-0.06	-4.8	2.4	1.18
Spain	49,590,099	0.94	-2.4	14.8	1.10
Poland	36,332,765	-0.34	-4.3	0.1	1.14
Romania	19,041,322	-0.17	-5.3	4.8	1.39
Netherlands	18,130,208	0.56	-0.3	8.2	1.43
Belgium	11,955,308	0.70	-0.2	10.1	1.44
Czech Republic	10,915,839	0.80	-2.6	30.6	1.36
Portugal	11,424,037	1.03	-3.2	8.3	1.41
Sweden	10,605,529	0.34	0.7	2.3	1.43
Greece	10,366,586	0.08	-5.5	-1.5	1.24
Hungary	9,488,428	-0.47	-5.1	-1.8	1.41
Austria	9,215,956	0.42	-1.2	7.3	1.31
Bulgaria	6,423,207	-0.13	-7.3	-0.5	1.72
Denmark	6,025,603	0.53	0.0	2.7	1.47
Finland	5,652,881	0.57	-2.6	10.4	1.25
Slovakia	5,409,407	-0.08	-1.4	0.2	1.46
Ireland	5,510,565	1.63	3.5	14.7	1.47
Croatia	3,876,002	0.32	-4.9	-0.1	1.46
Lithuania	2,887,592	0.17	-6.4	15.7	1.11
Slovenia	2,135,107	0.32	-2.2	8.2	1.52
Latvia	1,845,096	-0.99	-7.4	11.7	1.24
Estonia	1,360,745	-0.34	-4.4	16.7	1.18
Cyprus	996,571	1.39	3.3	7.0	1.38
Luxembourg	690,959	1.47	2.9	12.1	1.25
Malta	588,254	1,90	0.3	5.5	1.01

=== Migration ===
The movement of people within the Union i.e. internal migration, remains limited; it has traditionally followed two patterns:

- Younger workers from less economically developed regions and countries of the EU tend to move to more prosperous regions in their country or to other EU countries with good economic prospects (i.e. Ireland, Germany, Netherlands, France, Italy, Portugal, Spain, Poland)
- Retirees from wealthier places with colder weather (i.e. the Low Countries and Germany, among other places) tend to move to the sun belt in southern Europe – i.e. Spain, Portugal, Southern France, Italian peninsula, Croatia, and Greece.

=== Immigration and emigration ===
At present, more people immigrate into the European Union than emigrate from it. Immigration is a controversial issue in many member states, including Hungary, Bulgaria, Germany, Italy, Slovakia, Spain, and France. It was also a cited as a major factor in the Brexit referendum of 2016.

In 2022, 59.9 million people living in the EU, or 13.35% of the total population, had been born outside their resident country. As of 2019, the largest absolute numbers of people born outside the EU were in Germany (8.4 million), France (6.3 million), Spain (4.6 million), Italy (4.3 million), and the Netherlands (1.7 million).

In 2017, approximately 825,000 persons acquired citizenship of a member state of the European Union, down from 995,000 in 2016. The largest groups were nationals of Morocco, Albania, India, Turkey and Pakistan.

Spain and Italy in particular receives most of the immigrants coming illegally to Europe from Africa, probably due to their large coastal area and their proximity to the African continent. In particular, Spain has land borders with Morocco at Ceuta and Melilla and the Italian island of Lampedusa lies just 113 km from Tunisia.

African immigrants try to enter Spain by boat from Morocco or Senegal or by jumping the border fences. Dealing with Italy, immigrants mostly enter by boats from Tunisia and Libya.

Estimates are that between 50,000 and 70,000 people enter the European Union illegally through Spanish borders or beaches. Border fences have been built at both the Ceuta and Melilla borders in an attempt to stop illegal entrance to the country. Illegal immigration is an issue in Spanish politics, and also a big human rights problem, since many people die during the journey. Spain has been Europe's largest absorber of migrants for the past six years, with its immigrant population increasing fourfold as 2.8 million people have arrived, mostly from Latin America. Spectacular growth in Spain's immigrant population came as the country's economy created more than half of all the new jobs in the European Union between 2001 and 2006.

The net migration rate for the EU in 2008 was 3.1 per 1,000 inhabitants; this figure is for migration into and out of the European Union, and therefore excludes any internal movements between member states. Annual net migration has varied from 1.5 to 2.0 million people since 2003.

Country	Population 2022 (1000)	Foreign-born 2022 (1000)	%
(European Union) EU-27	448,388	59,900	13.35
Luxembourg	661	333	50.41
Malta	542	153	23.60
Cyprus	921	209	22.68
Ireland	5,271	1,151	21.83
Austria	9,105	1,963	21.56
Sweden	10,521	2,544	20.37
Germany	84,359	16,476	19.53
Belgium	11,743	2,247	19.13
Estonia	1,366	235	17.18
Spain	48,085	8,204	17.06
Portugal	10,467	1,684	16.09
Netherlands	17,811	2,777	15.59
Slovenia	2,117	309	14.61
Denmark	5,933	804	13.55
France	68,173	8,942	13.12
Latvia	1,883	241	12.80
Croatia	3,851	491	12.23
Greece	10,414	1,173	11.27
Italy	58,997	6,417	10.88
Finland	5,564	461	8.30
Lithuania	2,857	232	8.11
Czech Republic	10,828	764	7.06
Hungary	9,600	644	6.71
Slovakia	5,429	213	3.93
Bulgaria	6,448	169	3.23
Romania	19,055	531	2.79
Poland	36,754	933	2.54

== Most populous areas ==
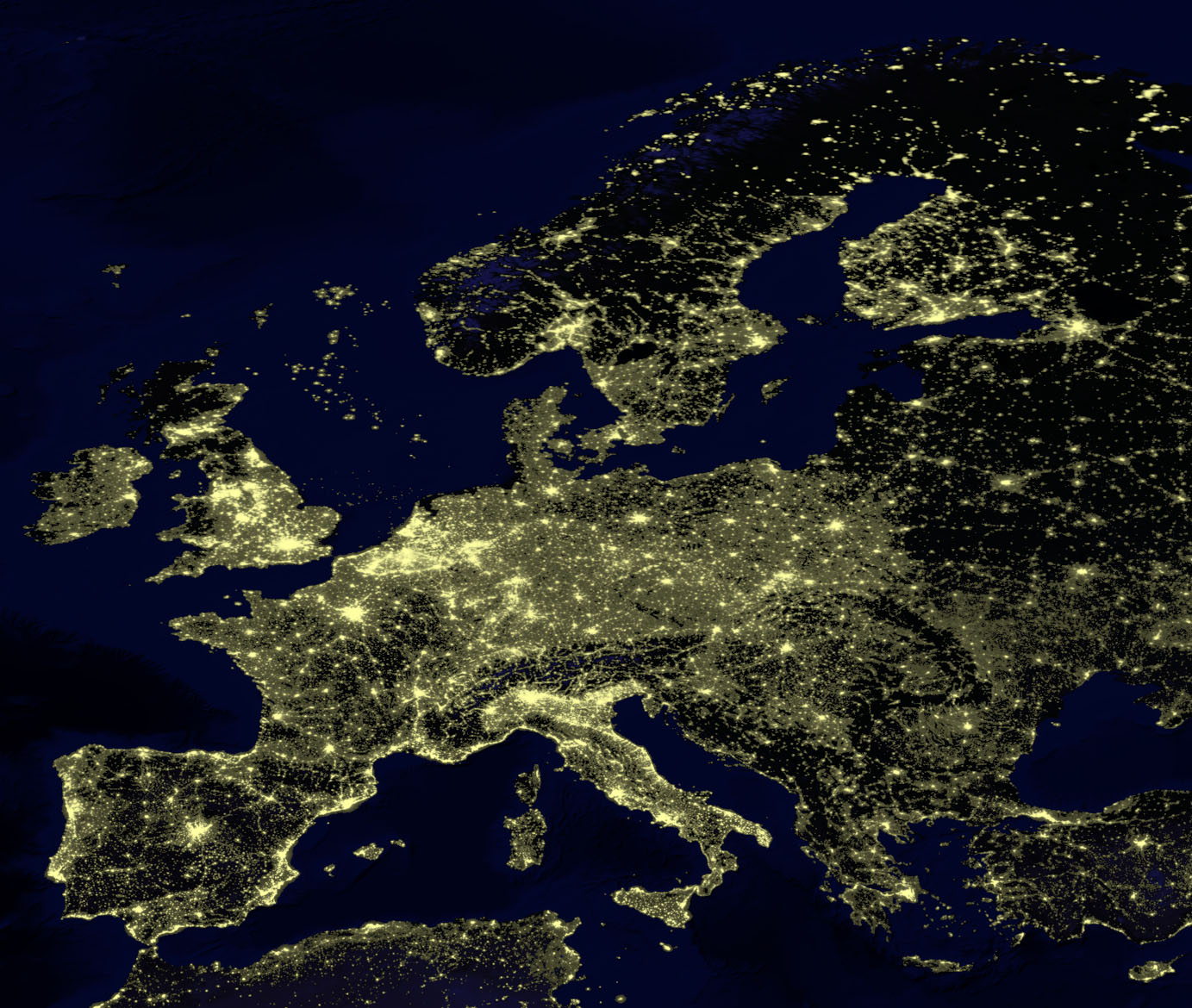
The population density of the EU is 106 people per km^{2}. Note that the lights in the North Sea are from oil platforms.

The European Union has a significant number of global cities. It contains 13 of the 60 cities that make up the 2008 Global Cities Index as well as 16 of the 41 "alpha" global cities classified by Globalization and World Cities (GaWC) Research Network (including Paris, Milan, Amsterdam and Brussels among others). The following is a list of the ten most populous cities, urban areas, and urban zones in the European Union, together with their population:

City proper (2023)	mill.	Urban area (2022)	mill.	LUZ (2016)	mill.
(Germany) Berlin	3.8	(France) Paris	14.8	(France) Paris	12.0
(Spain) Madrid	3.3	(Germany) Ruhr Area	6.2	(Spain) Madrid	6.4
(Italy) Rome	2.8	(Spain) Madrid	6.2	(Spain) Barcelona	5.4
(France) Paris	2.1	(Italy) Milan	5.5	(Germany) Ruhr Area	5.0
(Austria) Vienna	2.0	(Spain) Barcelona	4.8	(Germany) Berlin	5.0
(Germany) Hamburg	1.9	(Germany) Berlin	4.0	(Italy) Milan	4.3
(Poland) Warsaw	1.9	(Italy) Naples	3.6	(Italy) Naples	4.1
(Romania) Bucharest	1.7	(Greece) Athens	3.5	(Greece) Athens	3.9
(Hungary) Budapest	1.7	(Italy) Rome	3.2	(Italy) Rome	3.7
(Germany) Munich	1.5	(Portugal) Lisbon	3.0	(Germany) Hamburg	3.1

== Vital statistics ==
=== Statistics for the EU of 27 countries ===
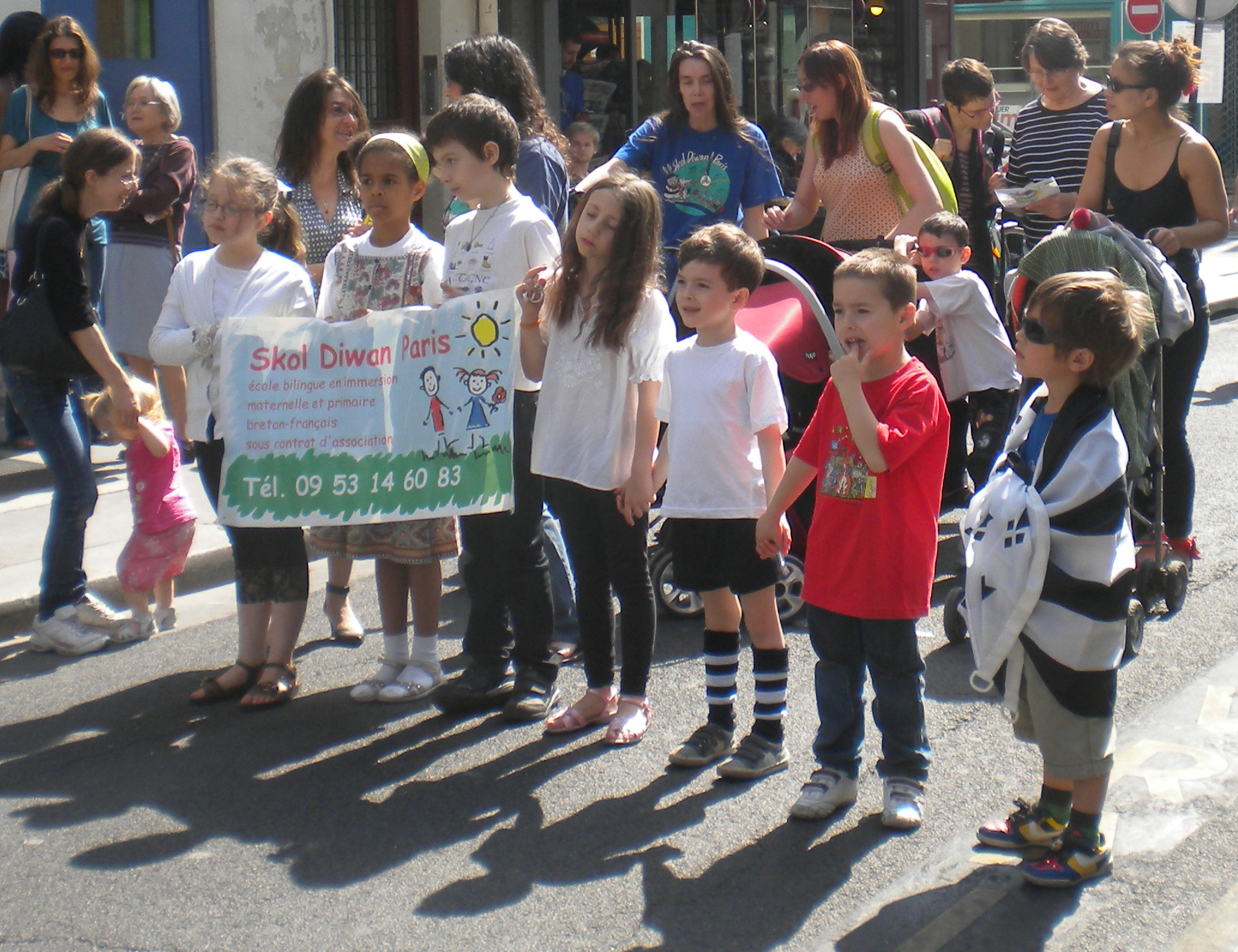
The fertility rate in the EU was 1.38 in 2023 (Kindergarten in France).

Since 2020, EU data is aggregated for the 27 current member states. The UK is no longer a member due to leaving the EU. Population is reported on 1 January

Year	Population	Births	Deaths	Natural change	Birth rate (/1000)	Death rate (/1000)	Natural change (/1000)	Migration change (/1000)	Fertility rate
1960	355,557,414	6,642,919	3,585,994	3,056,925	18.7	10.1	8.6	0.9	2.6
1961	358,917,677	6,657,429	3,508,800	3,148,629	18.5	9.8	8.8	0.6	
1962	362,292,099	6,600,463	3,721,195	2,879,268	18.2	10.3	7.9	1.7	
1963	365,754,385	6,715,244	3,723,423	2,991,821	18.4	10.2	8.2	0.5	
1964	368,938,389	6,796,911	3,622,925	3,173,986	18.4	9.8	8.6	-0.3	
1965	371,982,334	6,640,838	3,751,106	2,889,732	17.9	10.1	7.8	0	2.7
1966	374,882,363	6,578,243	3,718,683	2,859,560	17.5	9.9	7.6	-0.1	
1967	377,698,630	6,718,346	3,811,566	2,906,780	17.8	10.1	7.7	-0.7	
1968	380,351,144	6,610,324	3,951,103	2,659,221	17.4	10.4	7.0	-0.1	
1969	382,976,404	6,482,385	4,079,386	2,402,999	16.9	10.7	6.3	-0.7	
1970	385,137,827	6,302,419	3,986,877	2,315,542	16.4	10.4	6.0	-0.5	2.4
1971	387,270,862	6,303,901	4,047,311	2,256,590	16.3	10.5	5.8	1.0	
1972	389,902,199	6,152,597	3,995,901	2,156,696	15.8	10.2	5.5	1.0	
1973	392,434,984	6,032,514	4,079,758	1,952,756	15.4	10.4	5.0	1.0	
1974	394,804,887	6,098,560	4,046,095	2,052,465	15.4	10.2	5.2	0.2	
1975	396,936,395	5,961,857	4,163,866	1,797,991	15.0	10.5	4.5	0.7	2.0
1976	399,002,351	5,927,646	4,163,979	1,763,667	14.9	10.4	4.4	0.4	
1977	400,935,349	5,860,777	4,096,398	1,764,379	14.6	10.2	4.4	0.2	
1978	402,782,640	5,774,451	4,171,363	1,603,088	14.3	10.4	4.0	0.4	
1979	404,564,541	5,730,006	4,144,125	1,585,881	14.2	10.2	3.9	0.7	
1980	406,417,979	5,720,295	4,250,071	1,470,224	14.1	10.5	3.6	0.6	1.8
1981	408,131,851	5,591,081	4,217,650	1,373,431	13.7	10.3	3.4	0.0	
1982	409,501,178	5,523,341	4,183,575	1,339,766	13.5	10.2	3.3	-0.7	
1983	410,557,063	5,355,464	4,304,514	1,050,950	13.0	10.5	2.6	-0.4	
1984	411,456,968	5,318,550	4,233,094	1,085,456	12.9	10.3	2.6	-0.3	
1985	412,391,874	5,264,500	4,335,723	928,777	12.8	10.5	2.3	0.3	1.6
1986	413,482,162	5,243,235	4,296,210	947,025	12.7	10.4	2.3	0.5	
1987	414,653,514	5,193,167	4,242,345	950,822	12.5	10.2	2.3	0.9	
1988	415,967,079	5,221,160	4,246,582	974,578	12.6	10.2	2.3	1.1	
1989	417,372,976	5,123,258	4,265,774	857,484	12.3	10.2	2.1	1.2	
1990	418,764,395	5,095,162	4,324,569	770,593	12.2	10.3	1.8	1.1	1.5
1991	419,958,792	4,950,436	4,350,854	599,582	11.8	10.4	1.4	1.5	
1992	421,163,060	4,837,349	4,304,019	533,330	11.5	10.2	0.7	2.5	
1993	422,508,788	4,691,242	4,367,728	323,514	11.1	10.3	0.8	1.6	
1994	423,532,766	4,562,253	4,314,434	247,819	10.8	10.2	0.6	1.2	
1995	424,301,173	4,448,929	4,355,217	93,712	10.5	10.3	0.2	1.3	1.4
1996	424,957,650	4,453,778	4,361,669	92,109	10.5	10.3	0.2	1.2	
1997	425,560,270	4,446,644	4,316,381	130,263	10.4	10.1	0.3	4.8	
1998	427,740,621	4,420,951	4,329,087	91,864	10.3	10.1	0.2	1.4	
1999	428,431,186	4,418,622	4,331,000	87,622	10.3	10.1	0.2	1.0	
2000	428,929,021	4,487,745	4,267,048	220,697	10.5	9.9	0.5	0.8	1.50
2001	429,481,944	4,393,825	4,231,178	162,647	10.2	9.9	0.4	1.9	1.43
2002	430,487,481	4,364,928	4,284,989	79,939	10.1	10.0	0.2	3.5	1.43
2003	432,062,093	4,384,916	4,373,650	11,266	10.2	10.1	0.0	3.9	1.44
2004	433,732,008	4,441,177	4,190,920	250,257	10.2	9.7	0.6	3	1.46
2005	435,313,453	4,454,301	4,288,668	165,633	10.2	9.9	0.4	3	1.47
2006	436,777,748	4,515,537	4,224,330	291,207	10.3	9.7	0.7	2.8	1.50
2007	438,294,379	4,551,180	4,271,736	279,444	10.4	9.8	0.6	2.8	1.52
2008	439,771,089	4,675,051	4,312,237	362,814	10.6	9.8	0.8	1.7	1.57
2009	440,886,476	4,622,368	4,341,741	280,627	10.5	9.9	0.6	1	1.56
2010	441,583,436	4,603,858	4,344,647	259,211	10.4	9.8	0.6	-2.1	1.57
2011	440,916,055	4,458,386	4,318,817	139,569	10.1	9.8	-0.3	1.7	1.54
2012	441,511,575	4,417,656	4,441,347	-23,691	10.0	10.1	-0.1	0.9	1.54
2013	441,875,665	4,303,313	4,419,258	-115,945	9.7	10.0	-0.3	1.1	1.51
2014	442,235,565	4,361,239	4,372,607	-11,368	9.8	9.9	0.0	1.5	1.54
2015	442,883,289	4,330,922	4,620,411	-289,489	9.7	10.4	-0.7	3.1	1.54
2016	443,954,935	4,379,549	4,534,200	-154,651	9.8	10.2	-0.3	1.8	1.57
2017	444,609,939	4,328,560	4,661,081	-332,357	9.7	10.5	-0.8	2.2	1.56
2018	445,227,547	4,245,710	4,693,576	-447,866	9.5	10.5	-1.0	2.9	1.54
2019	446,060,538	4,168,656	4,653,033	-485,944	9.3	10.4	-1.1	3	1.53
2020	446,923,963	4,069,896	5,184,077	-1,112,697	9.1	11.6	-2.5	-0.1	1.51
2021	445,767,723	4,088,494	5,297,294	-1,208,880	9.1	11.9	-2.8	3.3	1.53
2022	445,999,571	3,879,509	5,158,399	-1,278,890	8.7	11.5	-2.8	6.8	1.46
2023	447,805,685	3,669,659	4,856,246	-1,186,587	8.2	10.8	-2.6	6.4	1.38
2024	449,489,862	3,552,919	4,811,984	-1,259,065	8.0	10.6	-2.6	5.2	1.34
2025	450,646,971	3,459,677	4,812,382	-1,352,705	7.7	10.6	-2.9	5.6	

View source data.
View source data.
View source data.
View source data.
View source data.

== Life expectancy ==
Life expectancy and healthy life expectancy in countries of the European Union in 2019 according to estimation of the World Health Organization:
Countries	Life expectancy at birth					HALE at birth					Life expectancy at age 60					HALE at age 60					
Countries	All	M	F	FΔM	Δ 2000	All	M	F	FΔM	Δ 2000	All	M	F	FΔM	Δ 2000	All	M	F	FΔM	Δ 2000	
Spain	83.14	80.54	85.66	5.12	4.05	71.69	70.90	72.42	1.52	2.80	25.39	23.28	27.33	4.05	2.69	19.18	17.94	20.33	2.39	1.78	(Spain)
Italy	82.99	80.94	84.91	3.97	3.62	71.43	70.85	71.92	1.07	3.04	25.14	23.53	26.56	3.03	2.60	18.95	18.03	19.78	1.75	1.94	(Italy)
Luxembourg	82.80	80.83	84.74	3.91	4.38	71.46	70.98	71.89	0.91	3.61	24.73	23.13	26.22	3.09	2.85	18.83	17.97	19.64	1.67	2.10	(Luxembourg)
Sweden	82.71	81.17	84.24	3.07	3.14	71.41	71.33	71.46	0.13	2.15	24.78	23.57	25.91	2.34	2.36	18.80	18.26	19.32	1.06	1.57	(Sweden)
France	82.53	79.77	85.15	5.38	3.62	70.72	69.78	71.60	1.82	2.74	25.69	23.63	27.51	3.88	2.68	19.26	18.07	20.33	2.26	1.89	(France)
Netherlands	82.34	80.85	83.76	2.91	4.33	71.08	71.05	71.07	0.02	2.98	24.65	23.43	25.76	2.33	3.33	18.64	18.07	19.16	1.09	2.16	(Netherlands)
Cyprus	82.18	80.20	84.16	3.96	3.35	71.13	70.69	71.55	0.86	2.66	24.36	22.91	25.77	2.86	2.53	18.56	17.79	19.31	1.52	1.93	(Cyprus)
Malta	82.15	80.31	83.98	3.67	4.33	71.16	70.80	71.43	0.63	3.14	24.59	23.06	26.03	2.97	3.77	18.91	18.07	19.70	1.63	2.66	(Malta)
Ireland	81.94	80.27	83.60	3.33	5.52	70.48	70.25	70.71	0.46	4.16	24.26	23.00	25.48	2.48	4.07	18.53	17.90	19.14	1.24	2.97	(Republic of Ireland)
Austria	81.65	79.45	83.78	4.33	3.47	70.44	69.73	71.10	1.37	2.81	24.09	22.43	25.60	3.17	2.14	18.18	17.17	19.10	1.93	1.56	(Austria)
Finland	81.65	79.11	84.15	5.04	4.06	70.19	69.05	71.29	2.24	3.33	24.36	22.49	26.06	3.57	2.76	18.28	17.09	19.37	2.28	2.08	(Finland)
Belgium	81.61	79.50	83.66	4.16	3.94	70.10	69.61	70.55	0.94	2.89	24.23	22.60	25.72	3.12	2.59	18.18	17.34	18.96	1.62	1.73	(Belgium)
Portugal	81.37	78.38	84.15	5.77	4.78	70.06	68.81	71.20	2.39	4.01	24.20	21.97	26.15	4.18	2.98	18.40	17.04	19.60	2.56	2.25	(Portugal)
Slovenia	81.29	78.57	84.04	5.47	5.24	70.23	68.78	71.69	2.91	4.25	23.82	21.84	25.64	3.80	3.34	17.69	16.41	18.88	2.47	2.44	(Slovenia)
Denmark	81.28	79.49	83.06	3.57	4.35	70.31	69.86	70.75	0.89	3.65	23.55	22.18	24.85	2.67	2.92	18.10	17.33	18.84	1.51	2.30	(Denmark)
United Kingdom*	81.22	79.50	82.92	3.42	3.36	69.74	69.38	70.07	0.69	2.46	24.12	22.91	25.25	2.34	2.81	18.25	17.64	18.82	1.18	1.96	(United Kingdom)
Germany	80.97	78.75	83.19	4.44	2.86	69.44	69.00	69.86	0.86	1.97	23.57	21.86	25.17	3.31	1.81	17.62	16.74	18.45	1.71	1.09	(Germany)
Greece	80.91	78.80	83.01	4.21	2.49	69.82	69.14	70.47	1.33	2.08	23.71	22.42	24.94	2.52	1.90	18.09	17.31	18.84	1.53	1.43	(Greece)
Czech Republic	79.14	76.30	81.93	5.63	4.11	68.49	66.92	70.01	3.09	3.18	22.08	19.93	24.00	4.07	2.75	16.32	14.87	17.62	2.75	1.92	(Czech Republic)
Estonia	78.89	74.69	82.61	7.92	7.92	68.37	65.80	70.59	4.79	6.52	22.50	19.20	24.96	5.76	3.89	16.93	14.66	18.63	3.97	2.87	(Estonia)
Croatia	78.60	75.58	81.59	6.01	3.85	68.38	66.66	70.07	3.41	3.15	21.87	19.71	23.79	4.08	2.50	16.34	14.92	17.61	2.69	1.79	(Croatia)
Poland	77.73	73.94	81.50	7.56	4.03	67.56	65.08	70.01	4.93	3.39	21.80	19.23	24.00	4.77	2.60	16.31	14.49	17.86	3.37	1.98	(Poland)
Slovakia	77.61	74.23	80.90	6.67	4.29	67.48	65.48	69.41	3.93	3.62	21.43	18.97	23.51	4.54	2.92	15.99	14.32	17.42	3.10	2.20	(Slovakia)
Hungary	76.34	72.98	79.52	6.54	4.98	66.59	64.67	68.39	3.72	4.37	20.21	17.72	22.27	4.55	2.25	15.17	13.48	16.56	3.08	1.84	(Hungary)
Lithuania	76.25	71.45	80.82	9.37	4.25	66.23	63.10	69.17	6.07	3.67	21.22	17.87	23.80	5.93	1.79	15.84	13.41	17.70	4.29	1.29	(Lithuania)
Latvia	75.68	71.05	79.97	8.92	5.47	66.02	63.05	68.74	5.69	4.82	20.77	17.44	23.26	5.82	2.46	15.60	13.24	17.37	4.13	1.87	(Latvia)
Romania	75.46	71.78	79.23	7.45	4.32	66.18	63.77	68.64	4.87	3.89	20.21	17.74	22.37	4.63	2.02	15.45	13.64	17.04	3.40	1.53	(Romania)
Bulgaria	75.00	71.52	78.62	7.10	3.36	65.67	63.46	67.95	4.49	2.91	19.70	17.24	21.92	4.68	2.10	14.99	13.25	16.55	3.30	1.58	(Bulgaria)
World	73.12	70.61	75.70	5.09	6.35	63.45	62.33	64.59	2.26	5.33	21.03	19.41	22.54	3.13	2.16	15.80	14.87	16.67	1.80	1.52	

* The United Kingdom has left the European Union in 2020

Life expectancy in countries of the European Union in 2023 according to estimation of the World Bank Group:
Countries	2023				Historical data											recovery from COVID-19: 2019→2023	
Countries	All	Male	Female	Sex gap	2014	2014 →2019	2019	2019 →2020	2020	2020 →2021	2021	2021 →2022	2022	2022 →2023	2023	recovery from COVID-19: 2019→2023	
Spain	83.88	81.20	86.70	5.50	83.23	0.60	83.83	−1.60	82.23	0.95	83.18	−0.04	83.13	0.75	83.88	0.05	(Spain)
Italy	83.70	81.70	85.80	4.10	83.09	0.41	83.50	−1.30	82.20	0.45	82.65	0.05	82.70	1.00	83.70	0.20	(Italy)
Malta	83.51	81.80	85.30	3.50	82.05	0.61	82.66	−0.56	82.10	0.16	82.26	0.19	82.45	1.06	83.51	0.85	(Malta)
Luxembourg	83.36	81.70	85.10	3.40	82.23	0.41	82.64	−0.50	82.14	0.45	82.60	0.35	82.95	0.41	83.36	0.72	(Luxembourg)
Sweden	83.31	81.70	85.00	3.30	82.25	0.86	83.11	−0.75	82.36	0.70	83.06	0.00	83.06	0.25	83.31	0.20	(Sweden)
France	82.93	80.10	85.90	5.80	82.72	0.11	82.83	−0.65	82.18	0.15	82.32	−0.20	82.13	0.80	82.93	0.10	(France)
Ireland	82.86	81.30	84.50	3.20	81.35	1.35	82.70	−0.25	82.46	−0.20	82.25	0.26	82.51	0.35	82.86	0.16	(Republic of Ireland)
Belgium	82.40	80.30	84.60	4.30	81.29	0.71	82.00	−1.30	80.70	1.10	81.79	−0.04	81.75	0.65	82.40	0.40	(Belgium)
Portugal	82.28	79.50	85.20	5.70	81.12	0.55	81.68	−0.35	81.33	0.05	81.38	0.25	81.63	0.65	82.28	0.60	(Portugal)
Slovenia	81.98	79.10	85.00	5.90	81.08	0.45	81.53	−1.00	80.53	0.14	80.68	0.61	81.28	0.70	81.98	0.45	(Slovenia)
Netherlands	81.91	80.50	83.40	2.90	81.71	0.40	82.11	−0.75	81.36	−0.05	81.31	0.30	81.61	0.30	81.91	−0.20	(Netherlands)
Denmark	81.85	80.00	83.80	3.80	80.70	0.75	81.45	0.15	81.60	−0.20	81.40	−0.10	81.30	0.55	81.85	0.40	(Denmark)
Finland	81.69	79.10	84.40	5.30	81.18	0.80	81.98	−0.05	81.93	−0.05	81.89	−0.70	81.19	0.50	81.69	−0.30	(Finland)
Cyprus	81.65	79.64	83.67	4.03	81.34	0.12	81.45	−0.22	81.23	−0.66	80.57	−0.14	80.43	1.21	81.65	0.19	(Cyprus)
Austria	81.54	79.20	84.00	4.80	81.49	0.40	81.90	−0.70	81.19	0.00	81.19	0.10	81.30	0.25	81.54	−0.35	(Austria)
Greece	81.54	79.00	84.20	5.20	81.39	0.25	81.64	−0.35	81.29	−1.20	80.08	0.70	80.79	0.75	81.54	−0.10	(Greece)
European Union	81.41	78.81	84.16	5.35	80.88	0.44	81.31	−0.88	80.43	−0.13	80.30	0.41	80.71	0.70	81.41	0.10	
Germany	80.54	78.20	83.00	4.80	81.09	0.20	81.29	−0.25	81.04	−0.25	80.79	−0.18	80.61	−0.07	80.54	−0.75	(Germany)
Czech Republic	79.88	77.00	82.90	5.90	78.82	0.40	79.23	−1.00	78.23	−1.00	77.22	1.71	78.93	0.95	79.88	0.65	(Czech Republic)
Poland	78.51	74.80	82.40	7.60	77.60	0.30	77.90	−1.50	76.40	−1.05	75.35	1.80	77.16	1.35	78.51	0.60	(Poland)
Estonia	78.49	74.10	83.10	9.00	77.03	1.61	78.65	−0.05	78.60	−1.65	76.94	0.90	77.84	0.65	78.49	−0.16	(Estonia)
Croatia	78.47	75.40	81.70	6.30	77.72	0.50	78.22	−0.70	77.52	−1.10	76.42	1.15	77.58	0.90	78.47	0.25	(Croatia)
Slovakia	78.02	74.70	81.50	6.80	76.81	0.85	77.67	−0.80	76.87	−2.25	74.61	2.35	76.97	1.05	78.02	0.35	(Slovakia)
Lithuania	76.99	72.50	81.70	9.20	74.52	1.77	76.28	−1.25	75.03	−0.99	74.04	1.61	75.64	1.34	76.99	0.70	(Lithuania)
Hungary	76.77	73.60	80.10	6.50	75.76	0.56	76.32	−0.90	75.42	−1.35	74.07	1.80	75.87	0.90	76.77	0.45	(Hungary)
Romania	76.61	72.90	80.50	7.60	74.91	0.70	75.61	−1.35	74.25	−1.44	72.81	2.34	75.15	1.45	76.61	1.00	(Romania)
Bulgaria	75.71	72.00	79.60	7.60	74.47	0.65	75.11	−1.76	73.36	−2.14	71.21	2.95	74.16	1.55	75.71	0.60	(Bulgaria)
Latvia	75.68	70.80	80.80	10.00	74.12	1.26	75.39	−0.20	75.19	−2.20	72.98	1.30	74.28	1.40	75.68	0.29	(Latvia)
World	73.33	70.95	75.84	4.89	71.78	1.09	72.87	−0.68	72.18	−0.97	71.22	1.75	72.97	0.36	73.33	0.46	

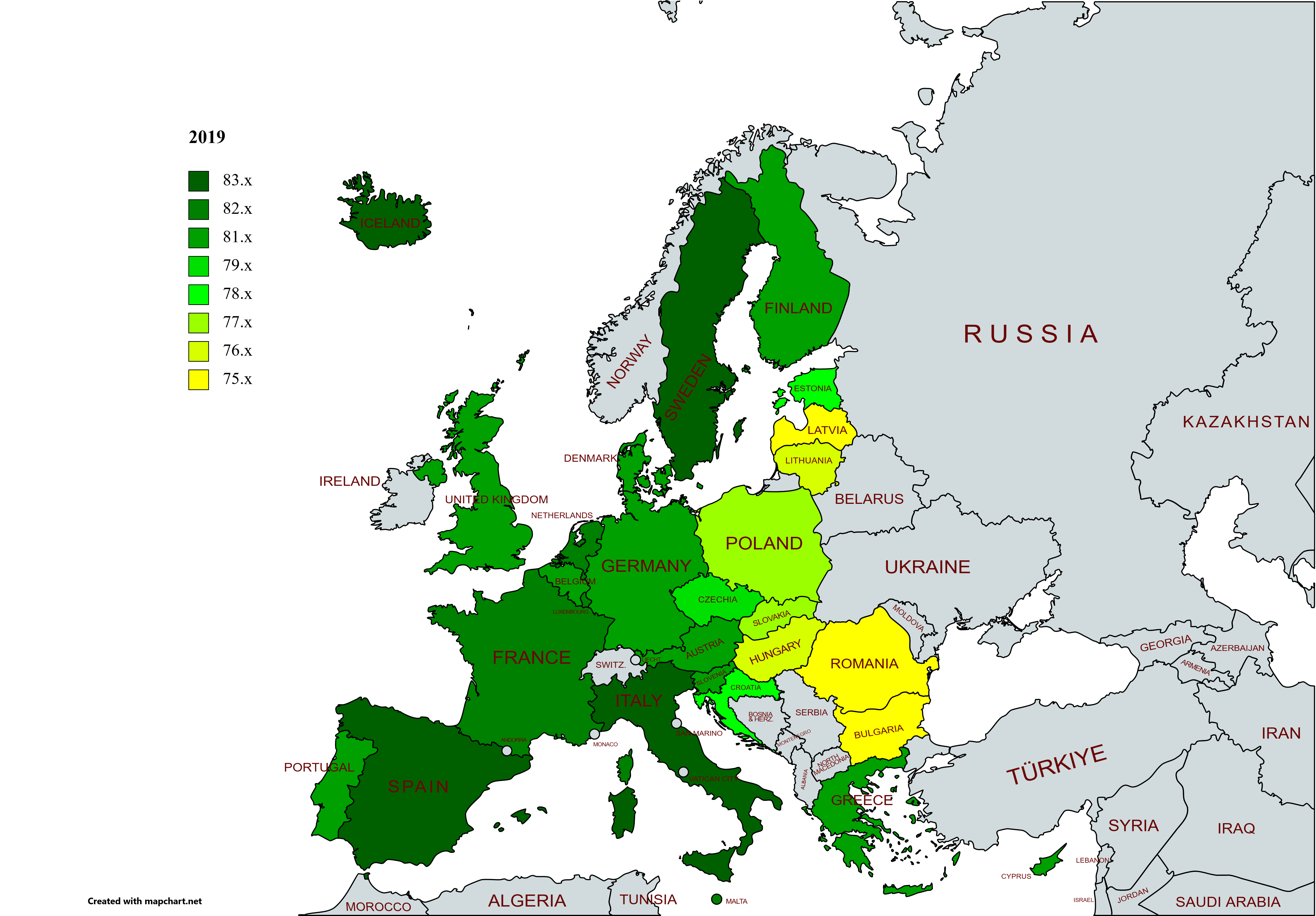
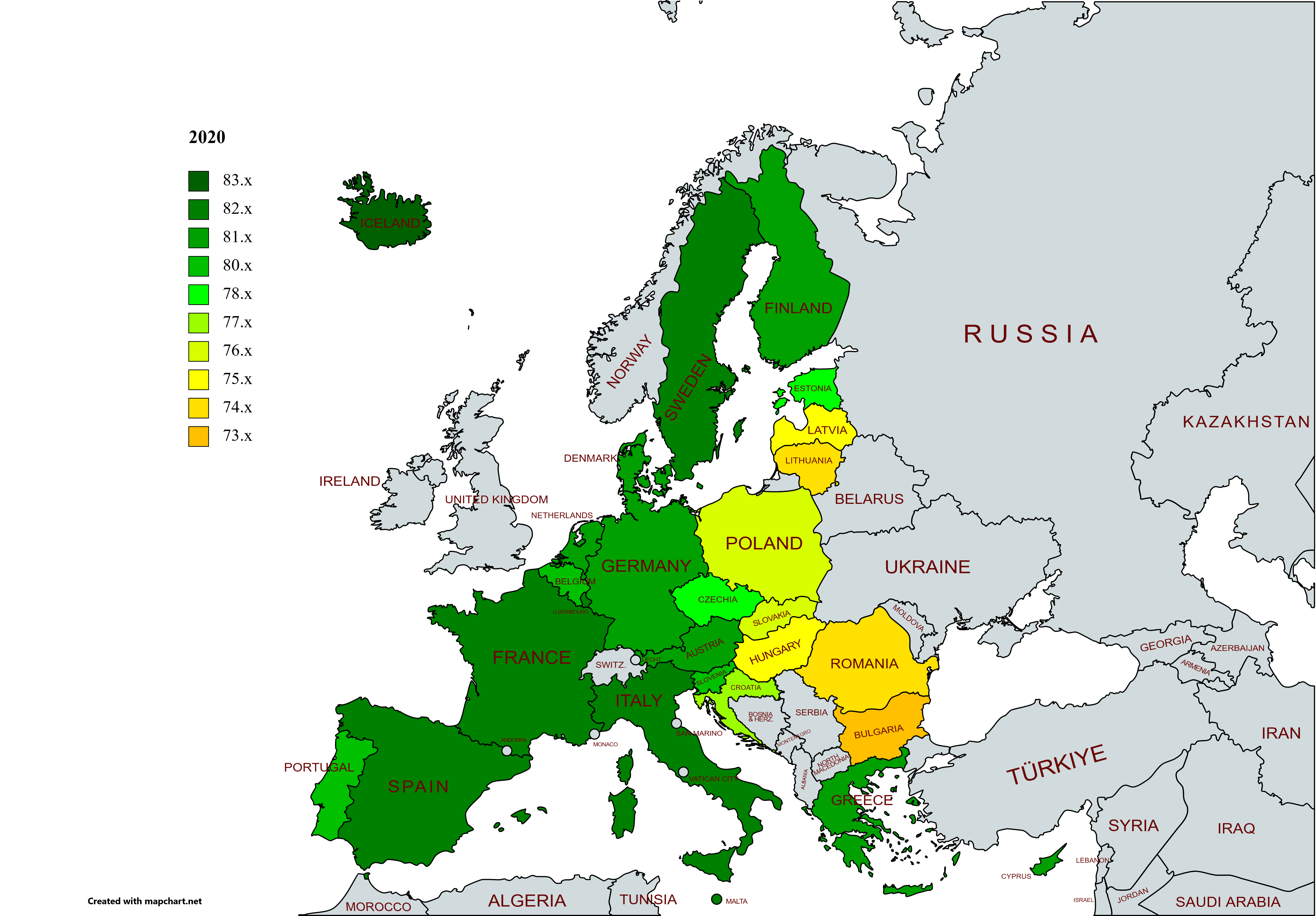
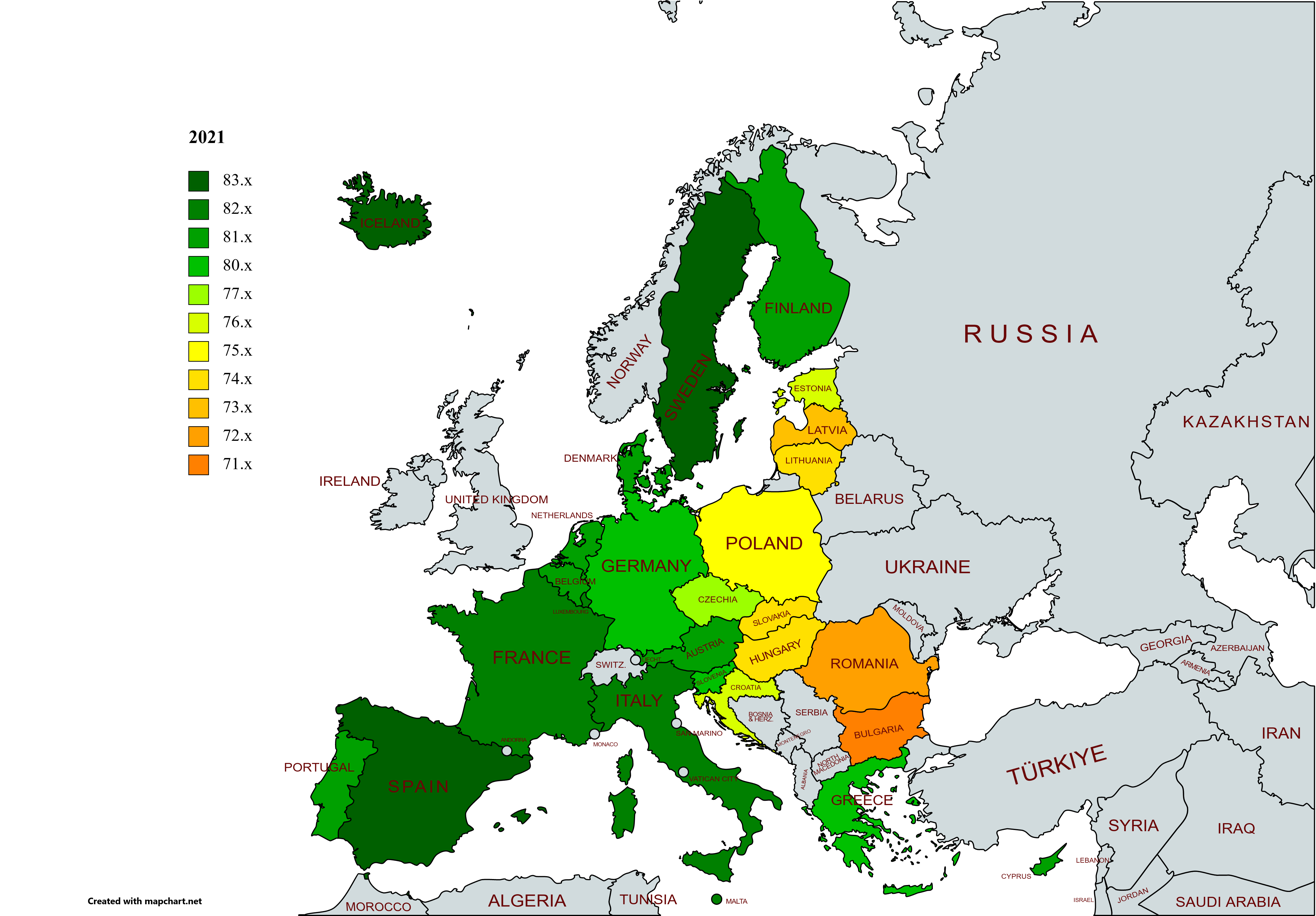
Change in life expectancy in the European Union from 2019 to 2021

== Ethnic composition ==
There is no precise or universally accepted definition of the terms "ethnic group" or "nationality". In the context of European ethnography in particular, the terms ethnic group, people (without nation state), nationality, national minority, ethnic minority, linguistic community, linguistic group and linguistic minority are used as mostly synonymous, although preference may vary in usage with respect to the situation specific to the individual countries of Europe.

Defining ethnic composition requires defining ethnic minority groups. The European Commission-funded European Social Survey considered three different ways to define ethnic minority groups:

- Citizenship, useful in western Europe but inadequate in eastern Europe when discussing certain social issues
- Country of birth in combination with country of birth of the parents, which gives three classes: native background, western foreign background, and non-western background with two levels: first generation (foreign born) and second generation (born in the country)
- Membership of a minority group within a country, as measured by a direct question.

The main EU statistics published by Eurostat focus on citizenship and country of birth.

=== Nationality ===
The largest groups, together accounting for about 90% of people in the European Union, are:

1. Germany (c. 70 million)
2. France (c. 63 million)
3. Italy (c. 54 million)
4. Spain (c. 37 million)
5. Poland (c. 36.5 million)
6. Romania (c. 19 million) (not including Moldovans)
7. Netherlands (c. 16.7 million)
8. Greece (c. 9.4 million)
9. Belgium (c. 10.3 million)
10. Portugal (c. 9.6 million)
11. Czech Republic (c. 9.8 million)
12. Sweden (c. 9.4 million)

Other nationalities of more than a million people are Hungary (c. 9.25 million), Austria (c. 7.5 million), Bulgaria (c. 6.25 million), Croatia, Slovakia, Denmark, Finland, Ireland, Lithuania, Slovenia, Latvia, Estonia, Turkey and Russia. Apart from Turkish people and Russians, all of these are citizens of the European Union.

=== Immigration ===
In 2011, almost a quarter of new EU citizens were Moroccans, Turks, Ecuadorians or Indians. The new citizens in the old EU27 in 2011 were mainly Africans (26% of the total number of citizenships acquired), Asians (23%), non-EU27 Europeans (19%), North and South Americans (17%) or another EU27 Member State (11%). In 2011, the largest groups that acquired citizenship of an EU27 Member State were citizens of Morocco (64 300 persons, of which 55% acquired citizenship of France or Spain), Turkey (48 900, 58% acquired German citizenship), Ecuador (33 700, 95% acquired Spanish citizenship) and India (31 700, 83% acquired British citizenship).

In 2012, 34.3 million foreign citizens lived in the old 27 European Union member states, accounting for 6.8% of the European Union population, of whom 20.5 million were third country nationals (i.e. nationals of non-EU countries). The number of foreign-born (which includes those who have naturalised or are dual nationals) was 48.9 million or 9.7 per cent of the total population.

A total of 8.0 million citizens from European countries outside of the old EU-27 were residing in the EU at the beginning of 2012; among these more than half were citizens of Turkey, Albania or Ukraine. The next biggest group was from Africa (24.5%), followed by Asia (22.0%), the Americas (14.2%) and Oceania (0.8%). Romanians (living in another EU Member State) and Turkish citizens made up the biggest groups of non-nationals living in the EU-27 in 2012. There were 4.4 million Romanian citizens living outside of Romania within the EU-27 and 2.3 million Turkish citizens living in the EU-27; each of these two groups of people accounted for 7.0% of all foreigners living in the EU-27 in 2012. The third largest group was Moroccans (1.9 million people, or 5.6% of all foreigners).

Approximately 20 million non-Europeans live in the EU, 4% of the overall population prior to Brexit.

=== Future ===
On current (2015) trends, European populations will become more ethnically diverse, with the possibility that today's majority ethnic groups will no longer comprise a numerical majority in some countries.

== Language ==
The first official language of each of the 27 Member Countries has the status of an official language of the European Union. In total there are 24, with Irish, Bulgarian and Romanian gaining official language status on 1 January 2007, when the last two countries joined the European Union, and Croatian becoming official in 2013.

Before Brexit, English was the most spoken language in the EU, being spoken by around 55 % of its population. This high proportion is because 38% of EU citizens speak it as a language other than their mother tongue (i.e. second or foreign language). German is the most spoken first language, spoken by more than 20% of the population following Brexit.

== Religion ==
The EU has significant religious diversity, mirroring its diverse history and culture. The largest religious group professes Christianity and accounted for 64% of the EU population in 2019, down from 72% in 2012. The largest Christian groups are Roman Catholicism, Protestantism and Eastern Orthodoxy. Several EU nations, for instance Germany and France no longer have a Christian majority. In some countries, the majority of the population has no religious affiliation at all (including Islam, Buddhism, Judaism, etc.), for instance in Estonia, the Netherlands, and the Czech Republic.

European countries have experienced a decline in church attendance as well as a decline in the number of people professing a religious belief. The 2010 Eurobarometer Poll found that, on average, 51% of the citizens of EU Member States say that they believe there is a God, 26% believe there is some sort of spirit or life force and 20% don't believe there is any sort of spirit, God or life force. 3% declined to answer. These figures show a 2% change from theism to atheism since 2005.

European indigenous (or native) religions are still alive in small and diverse minorities, and some have been revived as Neo-pagan traditions. These include, but are not limited to, Sámi neo-shamanism, Danish Asatro, and the Estonian maausulised movement.

The recent influx of immigrants to the affluent EU nations has brought in various religions of their native homelands, including Islam, Hinduism, Buddhism, Sikhism and the Baháʼí Faith. Judaism has had a long history in Europe and has coexisted with the other religions for centuries, despite periods of persecution or genocide by European rulers. Islam too has had a long history in Europe, with Spain and Portugal at one time having a Muslim majority. Large Muslim populations also exist in the Balkans and parts of Eastern Europe, due to a legacy of centuries of Ottoman rule.

== LGBTQ population ==
Estimates of the LGBTQ population in the European Union vary depending on the survey. According to the EU Loneliness Survey conducted in 2022 by the European Commission’s Joint Research Centre across all 27 member states, 6.1% of respondents identified as lesbian, gay, bisexual or another sexual orientation different from heterosexual. A 2016 survey by Dalia Research reported that 5.9% of Europeans identified as LGBTQ. In 2025, these statistics would translate to an estimated 27 million LGBTQ individuals.

== Miscellaneous statistics ==
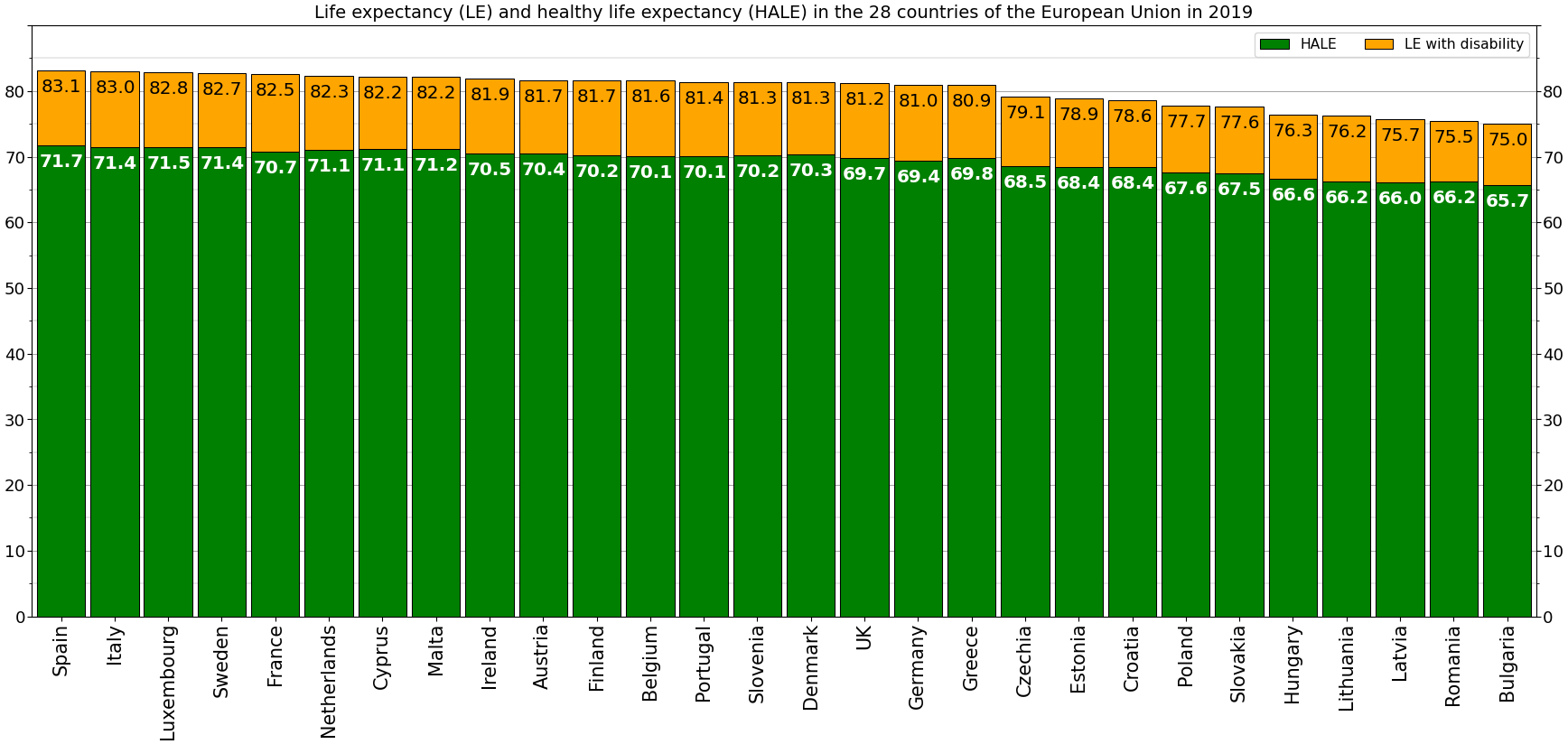
Life expectancy and healthy life expectancy in the European Union in 2019

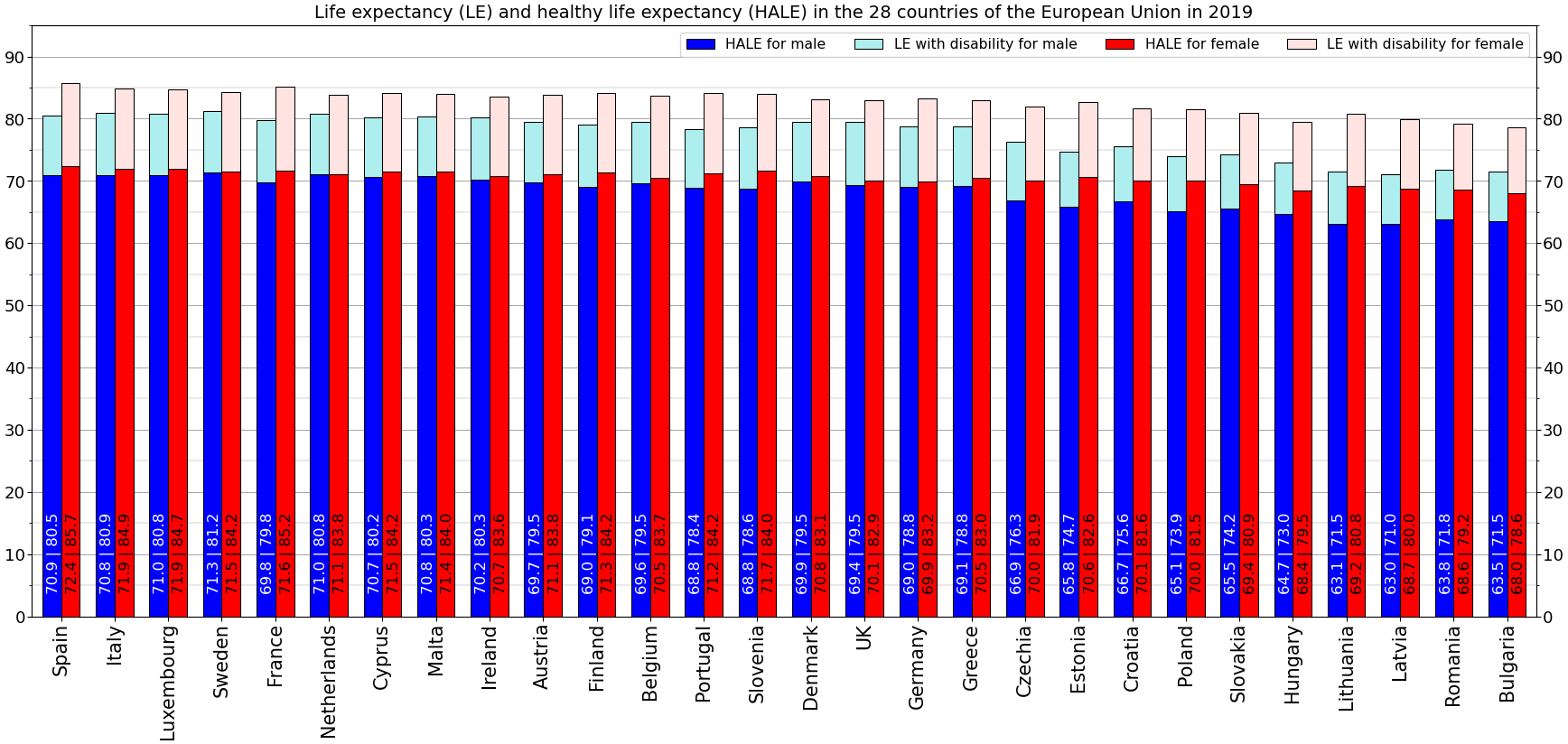
Elaboration by sex

Age structure: (2006 est.)

- 0–14 years: 16.03% (male 37,608,010/female 35,632,351)
- 15–64 years: 67.17% (male 154,439,536/female 152,479,619)
- 65 years and over: 16.81% (male 31,515,921/female 45,277,821)

Birth rate: 10.9 births/1,000 population (2008)

Death rate: 9.7 deaths/1,000 population (2008)

Net migration rate: 3.1 migrant(s)/1,000 population (2008)

Marriage rate: 4.9 marriages/1,000 population (2007)

Divorce rate: 2.0 divorces/1,000 population (2005)

Sex ratio: (2006 est.)

- at birth: 1.06 male(s)/female
- under 15 years: 1.06 male(s)/female
- 15–64 years: 1.01 male(s)/female
- 65 years and older: 0.69 male(s)/female
- total population: 0.96 male(s)/female

Infant mortality rate: (2005)

- total: 4.5 deaths/1,000 live births
- male: N/A
- female: N/A

Life expectancy: (2005)

- total population: 78.9 years
- male: 75.8 years
- female: 81.9 years

Total fertility rate: 1.59 children born/woman 2009

Live Births outside marriage: 40% of total live births in 2012

== See also ==
- Demographics of Europe
- List of European Union member states by population
- Population Europe
- Latin Americans in Europe

The demographics of the member states of the European Union:

- Austria
- Belgium
- Bulgaria
- Croatia
- Cyprus
- Czech Republic
- Denmark
- Estonia
- Finland
- France
- Germany
- Greece
- Hungary
- Ireland
- Italy
- Latvia
- Lithuania
- Luxembourg
- Malta
- The Netherlands
- Poland
- Portugal
- Romania
- Slovakia
- Slovenia
- Spain
- Sweden
