= Jan Hoem =

Norwegian demographer (1939–2017)

Jan M. Hoem
- Born: 17 April 1939; Kristiansund, Norway
- Died: 25 February 2017 (aged 77); Stockholm, Sweden
- Occupation: Scientist

Jan Michael Hoem (17 April 1939 – 25 February 2017) was a Norwegian scientist in population studies.

== Early life ==
On 17 April 1939, Hoem was born in Kristiansund, Norway. Hoem studied actuarial science and mathematical statistics in Oslo, and was awarded a Dr.philos. in 1969.

== Career ==
In 1961, Hoem's academic career began in teaching and Research Assistantships in Statistics at University of Oslo. In 1965, Hoem became a lecturer as Assistant Professor of Theoretical Statistics at the University of Oslo and later moved on to found and head the Socio-Demographic Research Unit at Statistics Norway. From 1974 to 1981 he was Professor at the Laboratory of Insurance Mathematics at the University of Copenhagen, followed by a professorship in Demometry at Stockholm University. In 1999 he was appointed Director of the Max Planck Institute for Demographic Research in Rostock, Germany, a position he held until he retired in 2007. Currently he is working as Professor Emeritus at the Stockholm University Demography Unit

Before he took his Dr.philos degree, he published a book called “Basic Concepts of Formal Demography”, which became the standard introductory text in demography in Norway. His article on Markov chain models has been named one of the four most significant papers in modern actuarial science. Hoem also made contributions to stochastic stable population theory, demographic incidence rates, and the statistical analysis of multiplicative models. He is best known for his work on event-history analysis—contributions that have helped shape demographic methodology.

Later in his career, Hoem turned towards social demography. In his papers on the impact of social policies on fertility, Hoem showed that the stringent application of appropriate methods to individual-level data greatly improve our understanding of the link between public policies, demographic behavior, and demographic outcomes.

He died on 25 February 2017 in Stockholm after a long illness.

== Awards ==
In 2006 he was awarded the IUSSP Laureate Award in recognition of his achievements in scientific research.
