= Human Mortality Database =

Measure of public health

The Human Mortality Database (HMD) is a joint initiative of the Department of Demographics at the University of California, Berkeley in the United States and the Max Planck Institute for Demographic Research in Rostock, Germany that provides detailed mortality and population data to researchers, students, journalists, policy analysts, and others interested in the history of human longevity. The key people involved are John R. Wilmoth (Director) from the University of California, Berkeley, Vladimir Shkolnikov (Co-Director) from Max Planck Institute for Demographic Research, and Magali Barbieri (Associate Director) from the University of California, Berkeley, and INED, Paris.

== History ==
=== Creation of the Berkeley Mortality Database, a precursor to the Human Mortality Database ===
In 1997, John R. Wilmoth at the Department of Demography in the University of California, Berkeley started work on a database titled the Berkeley Mortality Database (BMD) with a grant from the National Institute of Aging in the United States. The BMD included data across the entire age range, but was restricted to only four countries (France, Japan, Sweden, and the United States).

For the most part, the Berkeley Mortality Database is now superseded by the Human Mortality Database, but the BMD is still available online because some types of data available in the BMD have not been transferred to the HMD.

=== Creation and development of the Kannisto–Thatcher Database on Old Age Mortality ===
The Kannisto–Thatcher Database on Old Age Mortality (KTD) was founded in 1993 by Väinö Kannisto and Roger Thatcher with the support and collaboration of James Vaupel, Kirill Andreev, and many others. The KTD was first developed at Odense University Medical School in Denmark. Since 1996, it has been maintained and developed by the Max Planck Institute for Demographic Research.

Unlike the BMD, the KTD focused only on mortality above the age of 80, but included 30 countries (compared to the BMD, that included data for only 4 countries).

=== Creation and development of the Human Mortality Database ===
HMD began in 2000 as a collaborative project of the Department of Demographics at the University of California, Berkeley in the United States and the Max Planck Institute for Demographic Research in Rostock, Germany, with funding from the National Institute of Aging in the United States. It used data from the BMD (which had launched in 1997) and was also strongly influenced by the Kannisto–Thatcher Database on Old Age Mortality. After about two years of development, the HMD was formally launched in May 2002. HMD inherited the coverage of all age groups from BMD and the coverage of a diverse range of countries from KTD, thus combining the best features of both databases.

The methods protocol of HMD has steadily evolved and was last updated on May 31, 2007.

=== Short-term Mortality Fluctuations data series (STMF) ===
In response to the COVID-19 pandemic, the HMD team decided in 2020 to establish a new data resource: Short-term Mortality Fluctuations (STMF) data series in order to provide objective and internationally comparable data.

Weekly death counts provide the most objective and comparable way of assessing the scale of short-term mortality elevations across countries and time.

These data are collected for 38 countries: Austria, Australia (Doctor certified deaths), Belgium, Bulgaria, Chile, Canada, Croatia, Czech Republic, Denmark, England and Wales, Estonia, Finland, France, Germany, Greece, Hungary, Iceland, Israel, Italy, Latvia, Lithuania, Luxembourg, Netherlands, New Zealand, Northern Ireland, Norway, Poland, Portugal, Republic of Korea, Russia, Scotland, Slovenia, Slovakia, Spain, Sweden, Switzerland, Taiwan and the USA.

Sources are national Statistics Office or european organisation Eurostat, based on official Vital record (excepted for Australia: Doctor certified deaths)

STMF Data are published under a CC-BY 4.0 License. They are available through an online STMF visualization toolkit or downloadable in CSV or XLSX format.

== Reception ==
=== Academic reception ===
HMD data has been cited in academic research in demographic research and other research that relies of demographic data. For instance, there has been considerable research on the biological and evolutionary factors determining mortality and the differences in mortality across human populations. The data has also been cited in research that attempts to build better predictive models of human mortality. It has also been cited in research on specific causes of mortality and research on the social and economic consequences of changes in mortality.

=== Media reception ===
HMD data has been cited in the New York Times, the Washington Post, and Foreign Affairs.
