= Max Planck Institute for Demographic Research =

German research institute

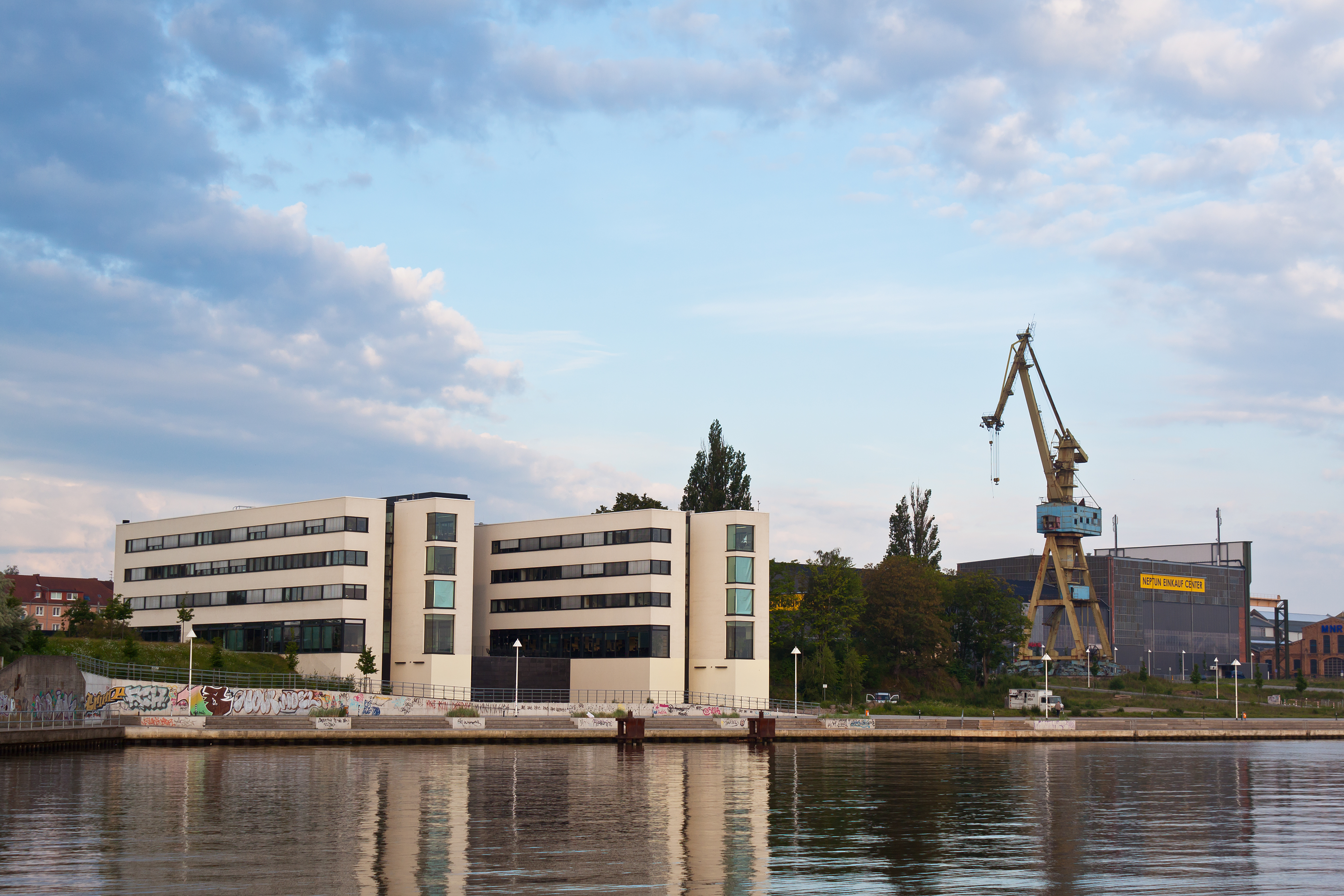
- Max Planck Institute for Demographic Research in Rostock, view from the waterfront
- Parent institution: Max Planck Society
- Focus: Demography, Human Biology
- Head: Mikko Myrskylä, Emilio Zagheni
- Budget: Federal Government (50%), States (50%)
- Members: ~ 120
- Location: Rostock
- Website: www.demogr.mpg.de/en

The Max Planck Institute for Demographic Research (MPIDR) is a non-university research institute of the Max Planck Society (MPG) in Rostock. The institute conducts research on fundamental demographic issues such as the development, structure and movement of populations.

== History ==
Following the marginalisation of demographic research in Germany after 1945, the Max Planck Society established its own research institute for demography in 1995. The Max Planck Institute began its work on 1 October 1996 under the leadership of its founding director, James Vaupel.

In 1999, Jan Hoem was appointed as the second director, establishing a further area of work. In November 2002, a new institute building on the banks of the Warnow replaced the temporary accommodation that had been used until then. In 2004, the Rostock Centre for Demographic Change Research was founded through a collaboration between the Max Planck Institute for Demographic Research (MPIDR) and the University of Rostock.

From 2007 to 2013, Joshua Goldstein served as director of the institute. In 2014, Mikko Myrskylä, whose research focuses on social demography, was appointed as the successor to Joshua Goldstein and Jan Hoem. Since 2018, the second director has been Emilio Zagheni, who focuses on migration and digitalization.

== Research ==
The institute conducts basic research, analyses the causes, describes current trends and forecasts the evolution of demographic processes. It also identifies possible consequences for society. The institute's research extends beyond the traditional areas of demography, such as population structure, spatial population movements (migration), natural population movements (births, deaths), population development and distribution, and historical demography.

In addition, the institute maintains and manages a number of databases that are available free of charge to researchers worldwide. These include the Human Mortality Database, the Human Fertility Database and the Scholarly Migration Database.

== Organization ==
Under the joint leadership of Mikko Myrskylä and Emilio Zagheni, MPIDR maintains several research departments.

=== Departments ===
Social Demography - Head of Laboratories: Mikko Myrskylä

Digital and Computational Demography - Head of Laboratories: Emilio Zagheni

==== 1. Department: Social Demography ====
Excerpts from the departments' self-descriptions

"The key forces governing demographic processes are social, political, and biological. The consequences of demographic change are similarly spread across the social, political, and biological spheres. The Department of Social Demography focuses on understanding how these forces jointly produce the modern demographic landscape; it charts possible demographic futures and their consequences; and explores the feasibility of adaptation for the future scenarios that are challenging in terms of economic, social, and other dimensions of sustainability. We place a strong emphasis on population-level trends and micro-macro mechanisms driving the macro developments. We use and develop cutting-edge mathematical, statistical, and computational methods and rich sets of existing register, survey, and biomarker data, as well as data collected by our teams and collaborators. The focal areas of our research themes are not bounded geographically or in time but have a leaning towards contemporary patterns and future challenges. The integration of knowledge across the five research themes holds the promise to develop a new understanding of demography as both consequence of and cause for social change.”

==== Laboratory of Fertility and Well-Being ====
“Research in the Laboratory of Fertility and Well-Being focuses on improving our understanding of the determinants and consequences of contemporary fertility trends. A key focus is on exploring the variety of socioeconomic and developmental conditions that potentially allow contemporary societies to reach fertility levels close to replacement levels. This includes investigations on the role of uncertainty and subjective well-being in affecting fertility decisions. Tendencies toward increasing social polarization within societies seem to particularly affect the lower social strata. Well-being goes beyond economic necessities, and whether well-being is affected by parenthood depends not only on individual-level characteristics but also on social perceptions of parenthood and childlessness in the social surrounding. We have now expanded our research to respond to the challenges that the COVID-19 pandemic created in family formation processes.”

==== Laboratory of Population Health ====
“Steadily increasing longevity is both an impressive achievement and a major challenge for the developed world. Continued improvements in life expectancy inevitably contribute to population aging, and are expected to strongly decrease the worker-to-non-worker ratio. The extent to which increasing longevity is good news at the individual and societal level depends on the answers to three key questions. First, are the extra years of life spent in good or in poor health? Second, what factors influence the health status, and how does this vary over the life course and across sociodemographic and spatiotemporal contexts? Three, how can health be measured, and which methods, models, and measures are most suitable for the analysis of population health? Research being conducted at the laboratory of Population Health focuses on these three questions.”

==== Research Group: Labor Demography ====
“[…] The MPIDR’s interdisciplinary Research Group: Labor Demography analyzes how demographic change, the labor market, and economic and social factors interact in shaping the workforce of today and of the future. We study how demographic development affects the size and composition of the workforce; our research is informed by sociological and economic theory and uses demographic and statistical methods. We take a full life-course perspective, analyzing how the expansion of education has influenced entry into the labor force; how economic uncertainty, parental leave, and other sources of voluntary and involuntary inactivity during prime working ages influence labor-force participation at the population level; how unpaid work distributes across as well as affects the life course; and how changes in health at older ages, policy changes, and shifts in economic opportunities influence how long people remain in the workforce […].”

==== BIOSFER ====
“[…] The BIOSFER -Untangling biologic and social causes of low fertility in modern societies- project investigates how social, biological and psychological factors work together to produce the observed patterns, levels and variation in fertility among young adults. We leverage ideas from several disciplines and propose that the existing theories must be complemented with concepts such as risk aversion and decision making under imperfect information, intergenerational transmission of fecundity, epigenetics, and beyond, in order to understand modern fertility behaviour."

==== MaxHel Center ====
“Mortality inequalities are socially patterned, growing, observed in all societies, and driven by upstream social inequalities in health and morbidity. Despite considerable contributions by many previous studies, there are major shortcomings in our understanding of the causes of social inequalities in health and mortality […] The Max Planck – University of Helsinki Center for Social Inequalities in Population Health builds on old and new conceptual insights and a completely unique data landscape to resolve these shortcomings, with complementary expertise from the Max Planck Institute for Demographic Research (MPIDR) and the Population Research Unit (PRU) of the University of Helsinki. The Center goes beyond standard observational research by using exceptionally detailed linked family-based data, natural experimental designs, genetically-informed social epidemiological data, and novel modelling techniques that enable us to unearth the pivotal social processes that generate health inequalities […]”

==== 2. Digital and Computational Demography ====
Excerpts from the departments' self-descriptions

“The main goal of the Department of Digital and Computational Demography is to advance fundamental population science, through the lens of digital and computational perspectives, for the benefit of everyone. Thematically, a first primary focal area, addressed by the Laboratory of Migration and Mobility, is on measuring, understanding, and predicting the causes and consequences of migration. A second primary focal area, addressed by the Laboratory of Population Dynamics and Sustainable Well-Being, is on monitoring, understanding, and predicting the factors that shape people’s well-being across space, time, and demographic characteristics, and as they relate to mortality and health, fertility, social and economic processes, and sustainable development.”

Migration and Mobility

“Societies are continuously facing the challenges of managing vital migration flows and integrating migrants in the context of below-replacement fertility, slow population aging, and sudden crises or shocks. While demographers have played a key role in developing migration theories and methods, a lack of adequate data generally hinders their validation and the development of new conceptual frameworks. Established data sources, typically collected from censuses, surveys, and registers, often lack sufficient spatial and temporal granularity. Definitions and modes of collection often vary across countries and can be inconsistent. Data may be partially or completely unavailable, especially in low- and middle-income countries […]. Our main ambition is to combine established and novel data sources within a solid statistical framework, measure and predict migration outcomes and the integration of migrants, and evaluate the impact of the digitalization of life on migration and mobility. As we pursue our goals, we also aim at improving our theoretical understanding of migration and mobility processes and informing policy decisions in a world that is increasingly connected […].”

==== Population Dynamics and Sustainable Well-Being ====
“The overarching goal of this laboratory is to monitor, understand, and predict the factors that shape people’s well-being across space, time, and demographic characteristics, and as they relate to population change and sustainable development.”

“[…] The concept of sustainable populations is multidimensional in nature and encompasses social, economic, technological, and environmental aspects that are intimately interconnected with people’s well-being and population dynamics. We aim at advancing fundamental population science, taking a future-oriented perspective. We study long-term population processes, exploring the interdependencies between micro-level outcomes and macro-level population dynamics, and this contributes to improving our forecasting capacity. But we also assess the implications of economic, technological, and environmental disruptions on population dynamics and well-being. By contrasting cases and circumstances in a comparative perspective, we evaluate the factors that explain different degrees of impact and resilience, as well as the capacity of societies to improve equity […].”

=== Joint Research Labs ===
==== Demographic Data – Head of Laboratory: Dmitri Jdanov ====
Excerpts from the departments' self-descriptions

"The Laboratory of Demographic Data is a world-leading team in the area of demographic data. Our flagship projects such as the Human Mortality Database (HMD) and the Human Fertility Database (HFD) are more than just highly cited data projects that have thousands of users around the globe. They define new standards for scientific databases in demography and stimulate advanced research in many areas beyond demography, including social epidemiology, actuarial science, family sociology, and social policy […]. Our Laboratory aims at providing data of the highest possible quality that are comparable across countries, well-documented, transparent, and easy-to-use […]. The Laboratory currently maintains and develops five international databases. All of them follow the principles of Open Data and can be freely used by the institute’s researchers and international scholars, students, policy-makers, and journalists worldwide […]."

==== Statistical Demography – Head of Laboratory: Jutta Gampe ====
“[...]The members of the Laboratory develop innovative statistical methods to address novel research questions. They advise fellow scientists in their analysis of data and provide software to facilitate the application of innovative techniques. […] Research topics include multistate models, the joint analysis of dependent longitudinal processes, the simultaneous consideration of several time scales in event-history models, and the correct handling of complex longitudinal observation schemes. Subsequent projections based on longitudinal models is another area of research. Researchers of the Laboratory also contribute to the educational programs the Institute is involved in (the International Max Planck Research School for Population, Health and Data Science; International Advanced Studies in Demography; and the European Doctoral School for Demography) and thus promote the use of up-to-date statistical methods in demographic research [...].”

=== Independent research groups ===
==== Kinship inequalities – Research Group Leader: Diego Alburez-Gutierrez ====
Excerpts from the departments' self-descriptions

[…] The Research Group on Kinship Inequalities, funded by the Max Planck Society, conducts research to advance the subfield of kinship demography, combining demographic modeling with empirical data analysis. The group studies how inequalities in kinship among persons and groups determine individual outcomes and ultimately shape the structure of human societies. […] The term “kinship inequalities” refers to differences in kin presence, availability, and resources for individuals. These disparities arise from a range of factors, including demographic dynamics, socioeconomic inequalities, and societal norms. […].

==== Gender Inequalities and Fertility – Research Group Leader: Nicole Hiekel ====
“The Research Group on Gender Inequalities and Fertility, funded by the Max Planck Society, systematically incorporates gender inequalities into the study of demographic processes underlying contemporary family complexity: union dissolution and repartnering, alternatives to marriage, births outside marriage and with consecutive partners, stepfamilies and other complex family structures. The research conducted in this group reveals how and under which conditions gender inequalities are produced and reproduced within individuals, couples and families and the social institutions in which they are embedded.”

==== Migration and Health Inequalities – Research Group Leader: Silvia Loi ====
“Despite having better health upon arrival, immigrants experience a more rapid health deterioration than non-immigrants. The immigrants’ health advantage is particularly strong upon their arrival due to selection processes, but tends to diminish as they age in the receiving societies. Nevertheless, the reasons why immigrants age in worse health remain poorly understood. […] Most research designs on immigrant health still tend to focus on the effects of single exposures on health outcomes, despite individual and population health risks arise from multiple sources across the life-course. The Research Group on Migration and Health Inequalities, provides new knowledge on how multiple structural social factors and their interactions influence inequalities between immigrants and non-immigrants during the life-course in the European context. […]”

== Former working groups ==
The following working groups have conducted research at the institute in the past:

- Research Group: Mathematical and Actuarial Demography, 2016–2021
- Max Planck Research Group "Gender Gap in Health and Survival", 2014–2020
- Laboratory of Survival and Longevity, 1996–2014
- Laboratory of Historical Demography, 2007–2012
- International Migration, 2013–2016
- Lifecourse, Social Policy, and Family, 2012–2016
- Modeling the Evolution of Aging, 2009–2014
- Lifecourse Dynamics and Demographic Change, 2009–2013
- Evolutionary Biodemography, 2005–2017
- Laboratory of Economic and Social Demography, 2007–2012
- Contemporary European Fertility and Family Dynamics, 1999–2010

== Doctoral programs and research schools ==
The International Max Planck Research School for Population, Health and Data Science (IMPRS-PHDS) was established in 2018 as a three-year doctoral program combining demography, epidemiology, and data science. Around 15 three-year doctoral positions are awarded each year. The school's curriculum is designed for doctoral students who enter with a master's degree or equivalent qualification.

In cooperation with the University of Rostock and other European universities, the institute sponsored the International Max Planck Research School for Demography, which was a training program for doctoral students in demography. This program was replaced in 2012 by the 'International Advanced Studies in Demography' program.

Another initiative to promote young talent is the European Doctoral School of Demography, an eleven-month program created in 2005 in collaboration with twelve universities and five leading research institutes.

== Infrastructure ==
The MPIDR is one of the 86 institutes of the renowned Max Planck Society. The Directors of the institute are Mikko Myrskylä and Emilio Zagheni. Like all Max Planck institutes, the MPIDR has a Scientific Advisory Board, who evaluate the scientific work of the institute.

The institute currently employs around 120 staff members and hosts numerous guests.

== Artworks and kaleidoscope ==
On the occasion of the opening of the institute's new building on March 31, 2003, new works of art were also presented to the public, intended to contribute to the permanent beautification of the institute. These pieces were selected through an invitation-only competition.

Among them is a six-meter-long kaleidoscope by Olafur Eliasson titled "The Wilhelm Lexis Demographic Observatory":

"It symbolizes the observation of phenomena from various different perspectives as one of the tasks of a researcher. The hexagonal kaleidoscope is composed of four high-grade steel segments, each of which consists of 1.5 mm-thick Raymax plates which are highly reflective on their inner surface. Six individual metal sheets standing on edge serve to increase the longitudinal stability. Additional strips of light enter the construction via 30 mm wide slits between the segments. A stainless-steel ring with which the kaleidoscope can be rotated around both its vertical and its horizontal axis is affixed to both ends. This rotation is made possible by a cushioned suspension somewhat above the center of gravity. The kaleidoscope is suspended in such as way that it will automatically return to a horizontal position after being swung."

Other contestants and artists whose works are exhibited inside the building are Gerd Frick, Sonia Brandes, and Helle Baslund. Gerd Frick won first prize with his free painting.

== Publications and public relations ==
Since 1999, the institute has published the open-access journal Demographic Research. Mikko Myrskylä is the current editor-in-chief. Anna Matysiak is the managing editor and is supported by several associate editors. The editorial office is located at the institute in Rostock.

Since 2004, the institute has also published the book series Demographic Research Monographs (Springer) and the newsletter Demographic Research First Hand. In 2024, the newsletter celebrated its 20th anniversary with a large-scale event featuring a panel discussion and a series of keynote speeches. Participants included the president of the Max Planck Society, Prof. Patrick Cramer; Bettina Martin (the minister for science, culture, federal and European affairs of the state of Mecklenburg-Western Pomerania); Antje Draheim (state secretary in the federal ministry of health); and Katharina Spiess (director of the federal institute for population research).

== Literature ==
- Max-Planck-Institut für demografische Forschung (Max Planck Institute for Demographic Research), in: Eckart Henning, Marion Kazemi: Handbuch zur Institutsgeschichte der Kaiser-Wilhelm-/ Max-Planck-Gesellschaft zur Förderung der Wissenschaften 1911–2011 – Daten und Quellen, Berlin 2016, 2 Teilbände, Teilband 1: Institute und Forschungsstellen A–L (online, PDF, 75 MB), Seite 371–377 (Chronologie des Instituts).

== See also ==
- Commons: Max-Planck-Institute for Demographic Research Rostock – Collection of images, videos, and audio files
- Extreme longevity tracking
- Institut national d'études démographiques
- Population Association of America
- Population Reference Bureau
- Population Europe
