= Population Europe =

German research institute network

Population Europe is a collaborative network of Europe's demographic research institutes and centres. It was founded in 2009. Its aim is to coordinate and strengthen research efforts and to contribute reliable facts and findings to public discussions of population issues.

The network operates under the auspices of the European Association for Population Studies (EAPS) and is supported by the European Commission.

Population Europe currently includes 36 European research institutes; it further collaborates with institutions working on population and policy issues.

== Organization ==
Population Europe has two branches: the Council of Advisors and the Information Centre. The Council of Advisors assembles researchers. The Information Centre coordinates the dissemination of demographic facts on population trends and policies to a scientific audience, as well as to the general public.

The Population Europe Secretariat is hosted by the Max Planck Society. The Secretariat is situated at the WissenschaftsForum at the Gendarmenmarkt in Berlin.
