= Joseph Gentile =

Banking official and subject of 2023 conspiracy theories

CAO of Leerink Partners
- Incumbent
- Assumed office 2007

CFO of Lehman Brothers, Fixed Income Division
- In office ?–2007

Personal details
- Born: 1969 (age 56–57)
- Education: St John's University(B.S., Accounting; MBA, Finance)
- Occupation: Finance executive

Joseph Gentile (born 1969) is an American finance executive who has served as chief administrative officer of Leerink Partners (formerly SVB Leerink / SVB Securities) since 2007. He previously held senior finance roles at J.P. Morgan and Bank of America, and served as chief financial officer for the Fixed Income Division within Lehman Brothers’ Global Investment Bank, leaving the firm in 2007.

== Early life and education ==
Gentile received a bachelor's degree in accounting and a master's degree of Business Administration in Finance from St John's University.

== Career ==
=== Early career ===
Gentile began his career at Arthur Andersen and later spent more than 10 years at J.P. Morgan in finance roles, including Global Head of Financial Risk Management. He subsequently served as CFO of the Global Corporate & Investment Bank and as CFO of the Private Bank at Bank of America.

=== Lehman Brothers (2006–2007) ===
Gentile joined Lehman Brothers’ Global Investment Bank as CFO for the Fixed Income Division and left the firm in May 2007, a year and a half before its September 2008 bankruptcy. Following Lehman’s collapse in 2008, the court-appointed Examiner issued a multi-volume report describing the firm’s use of Repo 105 transactions to temporarily reduce reported balance-sheet size at quarter-end, concluding that the practice was not adequately disclosed in public filings; the report describes the practice at the firm level and does not ascribe it to a single individual.

=== Leerink Partners / SVB Securities (2007–present) ===
Gentile became Chief Administrative Officer at Leerink Partners in 2007. He retained this position even after SVB Financial Group completed its acquisition of Leerink Partners in 2019 and the investment bank operated as SVB Leerink/SVB Securities, a legally distinct independent subsidiary of Silicon Valley Bank. Operations continued interrupted during SVB’s receivership until 2023, when the firm’s management team bought the business and it returned to its independence as Leerink Partners.

In March 2023, viral social-media posts inaccurately linked Gentile to both the Lehman Brothers bankruptcy and the collapse of Silicon Valley Bank. Independent fact-checkers reported that Gentile worked for the investment bank (SVB Securities/Leerink Partners), which is legally distinct from Silicon Valley Bank (the commercial bank), and that he left Lehman more than a year and a half before its bankruptcy.

== Notes ==
- FINRA BrokerCheck lists Gentile as Chief Administrative Officer at Leerink (formerly Leerink Swann & Co., Inc.) beginning in May 2007.
