= Deposit insurance national bank =

Bank created as a receiver for a failed U.S. bank

A deposit insurance national bank (DINB, /ˈdɪnbi/ DIN-bee) is a temporary bank in the United States that is established by the Federal Deposit Insurance Corporation (FDIC) in the wake of a bank failure. DINBs are authorized under the Banking Acts of 1933 and 1935.

== Characteristics ==
DINBs are chartered by the Office of the Comptroller of the Currency. Upon creation, the bank assumes the failed bank's insured deposits and temporarily provides banking services to customers. A DINB's powers are narrowly limited to servicing the insured deposits of a failed bank; it cannot acquire assets from the failed bank, as a bridge bank can, nor can it accept uninsured deposits, unless it is the only depository institution in its community.

The bank is managed by an executive officer appointed by the FDIC. A DINB is not required to have paid-in capital stock, has no board of directors, and is not required to own stock in a Federal Reserve Bank. Otherwise it conforms to the National Bank Act and other laws relevant to national banks.

A DINB can operate for up to two years. It can be acquired by another bank in its community, raise capital to become a permanent bank, or wind down and transfer its obligations to the FDIC.

== History ==
Logo of the short-lived Deposit Insurance National Bank of Santa Clara.

DINBs were initially the only way that the FDIC could resolve a failed institution. The first DINB was the Deposit Insurance National Bank of East Peoria, created when Fond Du Lac State Bank was closed by Illinois regulators on May 26, 1934. Under this original deposit insurance system, the FDIC assumed receivership of nine insured banks and paid off their deposits through DINBs.

After the Banking Act of 1935 permitted the FDIC to pay out depositors without establishing a DINB, use of this resolution method largely ceased, except for cases where a bank failed in an area with only limited banking services or where a prompt pay-out was not possible. For example, 1975 saw failures of Swope Parkway National Bank, a Black-owned business serving the local Black community, and The Peoples Bank of the Virgin Islands, which was the only locally owned institution in the U.S. Virgin Islands; a DINB was created for each in hopes of giving the community time to establish a replacement institution. Only five DINBs were created by the FDIC between 1935 and 1998.

Initially, the FDIC responded to the 2023 collapse of Silicon Valley Bank by forming a Deposit Insurance National Bank of Santa Clara because no institution was immediately willing to assume its substantial uninsured deposits. After the Treasury granted an exception to cover the uninsured deposits, the DINB was replaced with a bridge bank named Silicon Valley Bridge Bank, N.A.

== List of deposit insurance national banks ==
Deposit insurance national banks under the 1933 Banking Act
Year	Failed bank	DINB	Headquarters
1934	Fond Du Lac State Bank	Deposit Insurance National Bank of East Peoria	East Peoria, Illinois
1934	Bank of America Trust Co.	Deposit Insurance National Bank of Pittsburgh	Pittsburgh
1934	The First National Bank of Lima	Deposit Insurance National Bank of Lima	Lima, Montana
1934	The Florence Deposit Bank	Deposit Insurance National Bank of Florence	Florence, Indiana
1934	Bank of Lewisport	Deposit Insurance National Bank of Lewisport	Lewisport, Kentucky
1934	Farmers & Traders Bank	Deposit Insurance National Bank of Porterfield	Porterfield, Wisconsin
1934	The Pickens County Bank	Deposit Insurance National Bank of Jasper	Jasper, Georgia
1934	The State Bank	Deposit Insurance National Bank of Sauk City	Sauk City, Wisconsin
1934	Farmers State Bank of Bongards	Deposit Insurance National Bank of Bongards	Bongards, Minnesota

Deposit insurance national banks under the Banking Act of 1935
Year	Failed bank	DINB	Headquarters
1935	The Commercial National Bank of Bradford	Deposit Insurance National Bank of Bradford	Bradford, Pennsylvania
1964	First State Bank	Deposit Insurance National Bank of Dell City	Dell City, Texas
1964	Crown Savings Bank	Deposit Insurance National Bank of Newport News	Newport News, Virginia
1975	Swope Parkway National Bank	Deposit Insurance National Bank of Kansas City	Kansas City, Missouri
1975	The Peoples Bank of the Virgin Islands	Deposit Insurance National Bank of the Virgin Islands	Charlotte Amalie, U.S. Virgin Islands
1982	Penn Square Bank	Deposit Insurance National Bank of Oklahoma City	Oklahoma City
2009	New Frontier Bank	Deposit Insurance National Bank of Greeley	Greeley, Colorado
2009	Community Bank of Nevada	Deposit Insurance National Bank of Las Vegas	Las Vegas
2009	Citizens State Bank	Deposit Insurance National Bank of New Baltimore	New Baltimore, Michigan
2010	Barnes Banking Company	Deposit Insurance National Bank of Kaysville	Kaysville, Utah
2010	Waterfield Bank	Waterfield Bank, FA (Note: Organized as a federal savings association rather than a national bank.)	Germantown, Maryland
2011	Enterprise Banking Company	Deposit Insurance National Bank of McDonough	McDonough, Georgia
2011	FirsTier Bank	Deposit Insurance National Bank of Louisville	Louisville, Colorado
2012	Bank of the Eastern Shore	Deposit Insurance National Bank of Eastern Shore	Cambridge, Maryland
2023	Silicon Valley Bank	Deposit Insurance National Bank of Santa Clara (Note: Never operated; assets and liabilities were transferred to a bridge bank.)	Santa Clara, California

== See also ==
- Bridge bank § United States
