= SVB Financial Group =

American bank holding company

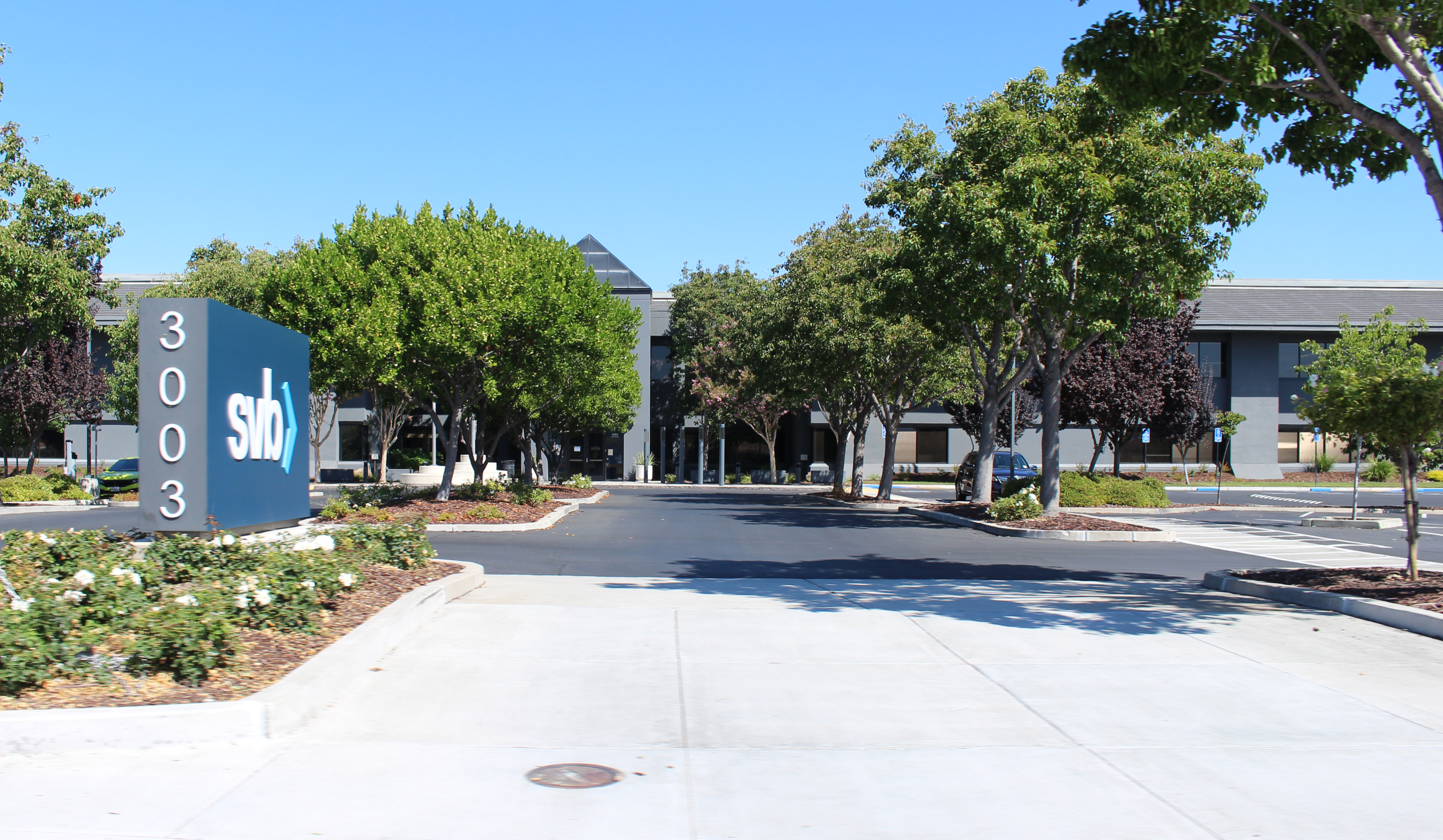
- Former headquarters in Santa Clara
- Formerly: Silicon Valley Bancshares, Inc. (1982–2005)
- Type: Public
- Traded as: Expert Market: SIVBQ (shares extinguished in 2024); Nasdaq: SIVB (1988–2023)
- Industry: Financial services
- Founded: April 23, 1982; 44 years ago
- Founders: Bill Biggerstaff; Robert Medearis
- Headquarters: New York City, United States
- Key people: Gregory W. Becker (CEO); Roger F. Dunbar (chairman); Michael R. Descheneaux (president)
- Revenue: ▲US$7.40 billion (2022)
- Net income: ▼US$1.51 billion (2022)
- Total assets: ▲US$211.8 billion (2022)
- Total equity: ▼US$16.0 billion (2022)
- Number of employees: 8,553 (December 2022)
- Subsidiaries: Silicon Valley Bank (1983–2023); SVB Private (1983–2023); SVB Capital (1999-2023); Leerink Partners (2019–2023)
- Capital ratio: Tier 1 15.4% (2022)
- Website: ir.svb.com

SVB Financial Group (SVB or SVBFG) is a financial services holding company headquartered in New York City. The company's main business unit was the commercial bank Silicon Valley Bank, until the bank failed in March 2023 after a bank run. The company was a member of the S&P 500 index until March 15, 2023. According to public filings, as of December 31, 2022, SVB Financial Group had 164 subsidiaries.

Until March 2023, the companies subsidiaries included Silicon Valley Bank and SVB Private, a private banking service affiliated with Silicon Valley Bank that, along with its affiliates SVB Investment Services and SVB Wealth, offered client services especially catered to private equity and high-net-worth individuals. Both Silicon Valley Bank and SVB Private were placed in receivership and sold to First Citizens Bank. SVB Securities was sold to its management in July 2023 and renamed Leerink Partners. SVB Capital was sold in May 2024 to a newly formed entity affiliated with Pinegrove Capital Partners.

== History ==
SVB Financial was founded as Silicon Valley Bancshares on April 23, 1982, by Bill Biggerstaff and Robert Medearis over a poker game. Silicon Valley Bank was incorporated as a wholly owned subsidiary in October 17, 1983.

In 1988, the company went public via an initial public offering, raising $6 million.

The company's stock price soared through the dot-com bubble but fell 50% when the bubble burst. The company reincorporated as a Delaware corporation in 1999. Ken Wilcox became CEO in 2000.

In 2001, the company's investment banking arm, SVB Securities, expanded its business with a $100 million acquisition of Palo Alto Alliant Partners, which was rebranded SVB Alliant. In 2002, it formally entered the private banking business, building on prior experience and relationships with wealthy venture capitalists and entrepreneurs.

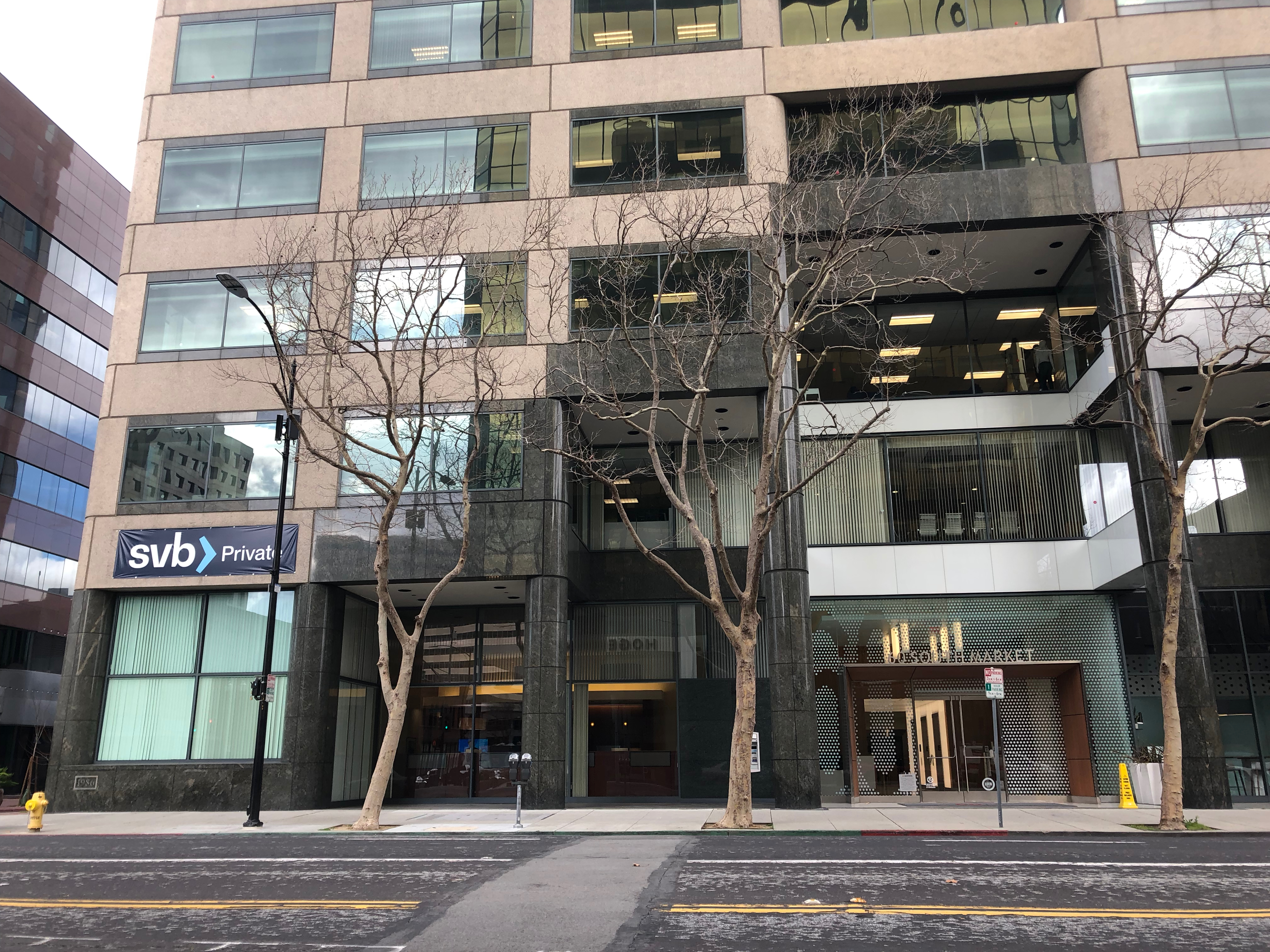
The SVB Private offices in San Jose, formerly operated by Boston Private Bank & Trust Company, on March 13 following Silicon Valley Bank's collapse

On May 31, 2005, Silicon Valley Bankshares rebranded as SVB Financial Group, signaling the company's diversification away from commercial banking. SVB Alliant ceased operations in 2007.

In December 2008, SVB Financial received a $235 million investment from the U.S. Treasury through the Troubled Asset Relief Program. The U.S. Treasury received $10 million in dividends from SVB Financial and, in December 2009, the company repurchased the outstanding stock and warrants held by the government, funding this through a stock sale of $300 million.

In 2015, CEO Greg Becker indicated that SVB had yet to make immediate plans to re-enter the investment banking sector as it had before 2006.

In January 2019, SVB Financial acquired Leerink Partners LLC, and renamed the business SVB Leerink. In 2021, SVB acquired Boston Private Financial Holdings and merged its subsidiary Boston Private Bank & Trust Company into Silicon Valley Bank and SVB Private. In 2021, SVB acquired media and telecom research company MoffettNathanson LLC. In February 2022, SVB Leerink was rebranded as SVB Securities.

In August 2024, SVB Financial Group received a U.S. judge's permission to turn over its assets to creditors and end its bankruptcy. As part of its bankruptcy restructuring, SVB Financial sold various assets, spinning off its venture capital business and investment banking unit.

=== Collapse of Silicon Valley Bank ===
In March 2023, Silicon Valley Bank experienced a bank run and collapsed. Then Federal Reserve Board Vice Chair for Supervision Michael Barr reported its customers tried to withdraw 81% of its deposits ($142 billion of a $175 billion total, as of the end of 2022) over two days. The failure of Silicon Valley Bank was the largest of any bank since the 2008 financial crisis by assets, and the second-largest in U.S. history behind that of Washington Mutual.

On March 10, 2023, the California Department of Financial Protection and Innovation closed SVB, Santa Clara, and appointed the FDIC as receiver, which transferred all the bank's assets to a newly established bridge bank. The holding company was not included in the bank closing or resulting receivership. It is no longer affiliated with either Silicon Valley Bank or SVB Private. When the FDIC took over Silicon Valley Bank on March 10, it seized the Santa Clara headquarters shared by the bank and SVB Financial Group; as a result, the holding company moved its headquarters to its offices in New York City.

On March 13, 2023, SVB Financial Group began exploring a potential sale of the bank's sister companies SVB Capital and SVB Securities. The latter's founder, Jeffrey Leerink, expressed interest in buying back the firm. SVB Financial Group filed for Chapter 11 bankruptcy protection on March 17, one week after the bank's failure. A group including Centerbridge Partners, Davidson Kempner Capital Management, and PIMCO reportedly bought a stake in the company in anticipation of the bankruptcy.

On June 18, 2023, SVB Financial Group announced it had agreed to sell SVB Securities in a management buyout, led by Leerink, with funds from the Baupost Group. MoffettNathanson LLC was not included in the sale. In July 2023, the buyout was approved in bankruptcy court, and SVB Securities was renamed to Leerink Partners.

On January 9, 2024, SVB Financial Group announced it planned to turn control of SVB Capital over to a new company controlled by its creditors.

On 20 March, 2024, SVB Financial Group announced that it would sell its Indian subsidiary SVB Global Services India to First Citizens BancShares.

On 3 May, 2024, SVB Financial Group entered into a definitive agreement to sell its investment platform business, SVB Capital, to a newly formed entity affiliated with Pinegrove Capital Partners and backed by Brookfield Asset Management and Sequoia Heritage.
