= Tiana Tukes =

American venture capitalist and educator

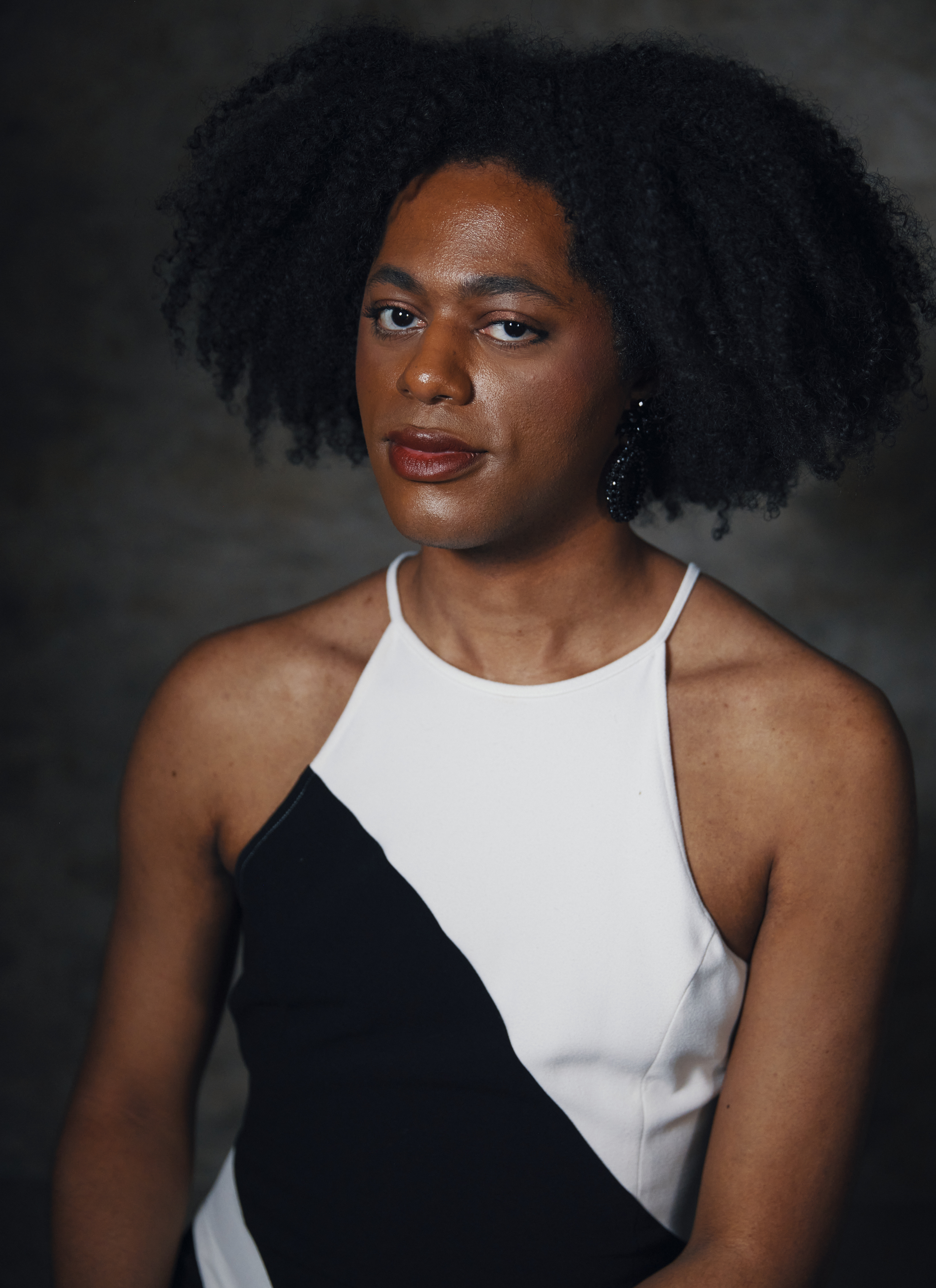
- Education: Morehouse College (BA)
- Website: https://tianatukesmedia.com/

Tiana Tukes is an American entrepreneur, educator and venture capitalist, currently a lecturer at Spelman College. She also co-founded and formerly co-led LGBT+ VC, a nonprofit supporting LGBTQ+ allied venture investors. She is the first transgender woman to hold a position at a venture capital firm managing over a billion dollars, and the first Black trans woman to lecture in entrepreneurship at Spelman.

== Biography ==
Tiana Tukes grew up in the metro Atlanta area, attending Eastside High School. She received a Bachelor of Arts degree with honors in cinema, television and emerging media studies from Morehouse College, where she was part of Phi Beta Kappa. After graduation, she worked at Accenture, Spotify, Silicon Valley Bank, and Sequoia Capital, among other businesses.

In 2022 or early 2023, Tukes co-founded LGBT+ VC with former early-stage investor Jackson Block. The nonprofit runs networking events, conferences and classes for the LGBTQ community, including a three-month college fellowship program for students in venture capital and a 2023 summit for queer and ally investors. In 2024, she resigned from LGBT+ VC.

Tukes was originally hired by the Spelman College economics department as an advisor for entrepreneurship program curriculum development; she currently co-teaches the Black Entrepreneurship Mindset with Millicent Springs-Campbell as an adjunct professor.

In 2025, Tukes was named on the Forbes 30 Under 30 list in VC.
