= Gregory Becker =

Gregory Becker may refer to:

- Gregory R. Becker (born 1954), American politician from New York
- Gregory W. Becker (born 1967/8), American businessman and final CEO of Silicon Valley Bank (SVB)
