= Brex =

Fintech company owned by Capital One

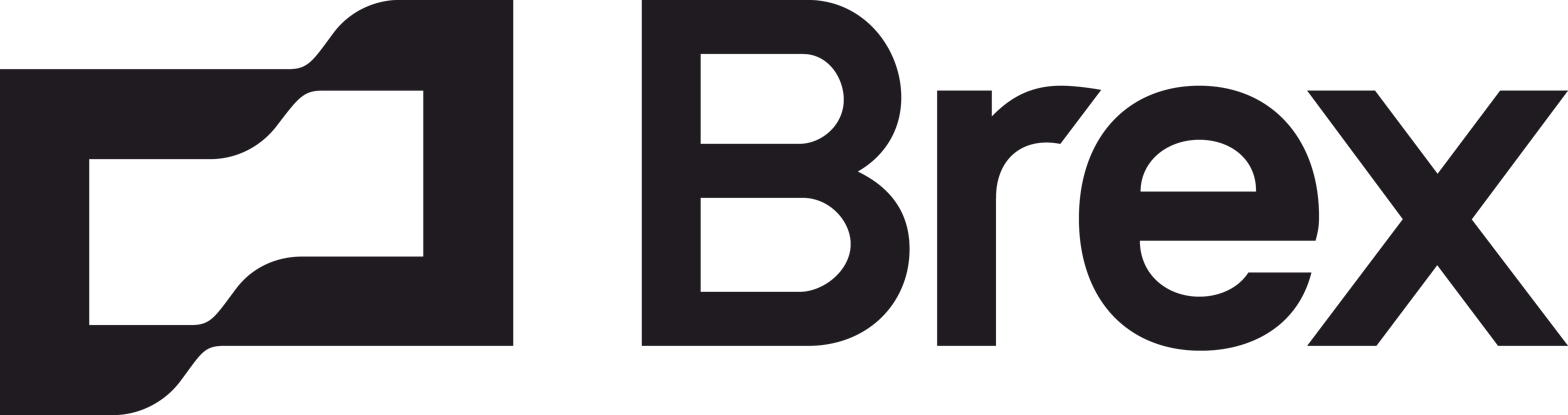
- Type: Subsidiary
- Industry: Fintech
- Founded: January 2017; 9 years ago
- Founders: Henrique Dubugras; Pedro Franceschi
- Headquarters: San Francisco, California
- Key people: Henrique Dubugras; (Chairman); Pedro Franceschi; (CEO)
- Products: Credit cards Cash management accounts Spend management software platform
- Number of employees: 1,100 (2025)
- Parent: Capital One
- Website: brex.com

Brex, a subsidiary of Capital One, is an American fintech company that offers credit cards and cash management accounts as well as a spend management software platform to startup technology companies.

== History ==
Brex was founded by Brazilian entrepreneurs Henrique Dubugras and Pedro Franceschi, both aged 22, on January 3, 2017. They had previously founded an online payments company, Pagar.me, which they sold in 2016 to StoneCo, a Brazilian credit card processor, for "tens of millions".

Brex began as a VR startup. The founders were accepted into the Winter 2017 batch Y Combinator's 12-week accelerator program; 3 weeks in, they pivoted the company to financial technology with the goal of providing credit cards to startups with venture capital funding but with limited credit history.

By August 2018, the company had over 1,000 customers.

In February 2021, the company applied with the Federal Deposit Insurance Corporation and the Utah Department of Financial Institutions (UDFI) to establish Brex Bank. It appointed Bruce Wallace, a former Silicon Valley Bank (SVB) executive as CEO. A few months later, Brex invested in the Indian card startup Kodo.

In August 2021, the company closed its headquarters in San Francisco and became headquarterless.

In April 2022, Brex launched Brex Empower, a financial software platform to help people comply with their employers' expense policies.

In June 2022, Brex exited the small and midsize businesses (SMB) market, shifting the company's focus to serving enterprise customers.

Brex received billions of dollars in deposits from Silicon Valley Bank customers on March 9, 2023—a day prior to the collapse of Silicon Valley Bank.

In May 2024, CNBC ranked Brex fourth on its 2024 Disruptor 50 list.

In January 2024, Brex laid off 300 employees, or roughly 20% of its workforce due to slowing growth.

In August 2025, the company gained a license to operate in the European Union. That month, the company leased 100,000 square feet in South of Market, San Francisco.

In April 2026, Capital One acquired Brex for $5.15 billion, equal parts cash and stock. This was less than half of their 2021 valuation of $12.3 billion.

=== Funding history ===
Before the acquisition by Capital One, the company raised $2.3 billion in total equity financing.

Micky Malka's Ribbit Capital led Brex's $7 million Series A shortly after its founding in 2017.

In June 2018, the company raised $50 million in a Series B round from Y Combinator Continuity, Ribbit Capital, Peter Thiel, and Max Levchin.

In October 2018, the company raised $125 million in a Series C round at a $1.1 billion valuation. The round was led by Greenoaks Capital, DST Global, and Institutional Venture Partners.

In June 2019, the company raised $100 million in Series C-2 funding at a valuation of $2.6 billion. The round was led by Kleiner Perkins. Existing investors DST Global, Institutional Venture Partners, Y Combinator, and Greenoaks Capital also participated.

In May 2020, the company raised $150 million in a Series C extension.

In April 2021, the company raised $425 million in a Series D round at a $7.4 billion valuation. The round was led by Tiger Global.

In October 2021, the company raised $300 million at a $12.3 billion valuation.
