= BACC =

BACC may stand for:

- Bachelor of Accountancy (B.Acc.), an academic degree
- Baccalauréat (usual abbreviated bac), French high school diploma
- Bangkok Art and Culture Centre, a contemporary arts museum in Bangkok, Thailand
- Bay Area Climate Collaborative, a non-profit organization in the San Francisco Bay Area
- Billiards Association and Control Council, a now defunct governing body of professional snooker and English billiards
- Blocco Automatico a Correnti Codificate, an Italian train protection system
- Broadcast Advertising Clearance Centre, a former British non-government organization responsible for pre-approving television commercials
