= Economic Growth, Regulatory Relief, and Consumer Protection Act =

United States Law

- Long title: To promote economic growth, provide tailored regulatory relief, and enhance consumer protections, and for other purposes.
- Enacted by: the 115th United States Congress
- Effective: May 24, 2018

Citations
- Public law: Pub. L. 115–174 (text) (PDF)

Codification
- Acts amended: Commodity Exchange Act; Consumer Credit Protection Act; Federal Deposit Insurance Act; Federal Deposit Insurance Corporation Improvement Act of 1991; Federal Reserve Act; Financial Institutions Reform, Recovery, and Enforcement Act of 1989; International Banking Act of 1978; Protecting Tenants at Foreclosure Act; Revised Statutes of the United States; Securities Exchange Act of 1934; Truth in Lending Act; Dodd–Frank Wall Street Reform and Consumer Protection Act
- Titles amended: 12 U.S.C.: Banks and Banking; 15 U.S.C.: Commerce and Trade

Legislative history
- Introduced in the Senate as "Economic Growth, Regulatory Relief, and Consumer Protection Act" (S. 2155) by Mike Crapo (R–ID) on November 16, 2017; Committee consideration by Banking, Housing, and Urban Affairs; Passed the Senate with amendment on March 14, 2018 (67–31); Passed the House on May 22, 2018 (258–159); Signed into law by President Donald Trump on May 24, 2018

The Economic Growth, Regulatory Relief, and Consumer Protection Act (abbreviated EGRRCPA; Pub. L. 115–174 (text) (PDF), S. 2155) was signed into law by President Donald Trump on May 24, 2018. The bill eased financial regulations imposed by the Dodd–Frank Wall Street Reform and Consumer Protection Act after the 2008 financial crisis.

Specifically, the bill raised the asset threshold for a bank to be considered too big to fail from $50 billion to $250 billion. For the vast majority of banks, the bill cut back on requirements for reporting of mortgage loan data. The bill also eliminated the Volcker Rule for small banks with less than $10 billion in assets.

The Act was the most significant change to U.S. banking regulations since Dodd–Frank.

== Legislative history ==
In the House, the bill passed by a 258-159 vote with support from all but one Republican (the exception being Walter B. Jones Jr.) and 33 out of 193 Democrats. In the Senate, the bill passed by a 67-31 vote with support from all Republicans and 17 out of 47 Democrats. Within the Democratic caucuses, progressives strongly opposed the bill.

== Barney Frank's views ==
Barney Frank, leading co-sponsor of Dodd-Frank, described the $50 billion dollar threshold for systemically important financial institutions requiring greater supervision as a mistake. Chris Dodd said in 2018 that this limit was lower than he would have preferred even at the time of drafting, but was imposed under pressure from Republican legislators to place substantial constraints on institutions too big to fail. Frank had repeatedly advocated for raising the threshold to $100-125 billion. In 2018 he at times objected that the $250 billion threshold of the EGRRCPA was too high, but also at times expressed support for the change and stated that the high threshold wasn't a problem because "The bill does allow the regulators that do the extra scrutiny to reach a bank that has less than $250 billion in assets if they think they should."

Frank supported EGRRCPA's provisions exempting financial institutions under $10 billion from the Volcker Rule, and its relaxing of qualified mortgage requirements for small banks.

Frank also opposed several provisions of the EGRRCPA, namely the decreased mortgage discrimination reporting requirements under the Home Mortgage Disclosure Act, the decreased regulation of large foreign banks with smaller presence in the United States, and limits on Financial Stability Oversight Council discretionary supervisory authority.

== Aftermath ==
In the wake of the 2023 banking crisis, some banking experts said that Silicon Valley Bank and Signature Bank would have managed its risks better had Dodd-Frank "not been rolled back under President Trump," however other experts have disputed this assertion as Silicon Valley Bank was still required to undergo periodic stress testing under the Act.

A lengthy report done by Michael S. Barr of the Federal Reserve Board of Governors, stated that Silicon Valley Bank (SVB) had failed due to a "textbook case of mismanagement" and that top leaders at the bank "failed to manage basic interest rate and liquidity risks". Barr also found that the Federal Reserve Supervisors had failed to take action against SVB and that even SVB's own board of directors failed to watch over leadership and that SVB's standards were "too low" demonstrating the weaknesses in regulation and lack of supervision, which was exaggerated by the loosening of the Dodd–Frank Wall Street Reform and Consumer Protection Act. In his analysis Barr said that the SVB Board response to the Economic Growth, Regulatory Relief, and Consumer Protection Act (EGRRCPA) led to a "less assertive supervisory approach", as well as reducing standards and increasing complexity, which left SVB with many vulnerabilities. Other factors were the combination of social media posts of concern about a bank run, as depositors quickly started withdrawing funds, speeding up the bank run and causing this to ripple to other banks.

SVB’s CEO Greg Becker supported the rollback and explicitly lobbied for its passage, due to the reduced frequency and number of scenarios required for stress testing implemented under the Dodd–Frank Wall Street Reform and Consumer Protection Act for banks with under $250 billion in assets. The Federal Reserve Bank of San Francisco did have discretion to annually examine any bank with $100 billion in assets.
