= Bridge bank (disambiguation) =

A bridge bank is a bank created by a national regulator or deposit insurance corporation to allow the uninterrupted operation of a defunct or failed bank until its assets may be sold.

Bridge bank may also refer to:

- Bridge bank (Nigeria)
- Bridge bank (United States)
- Bridge Bank, a commercial bank owned by Western Alliance Bancorporation and based in San Jose, California
