= Collapse of Silicon Valley Bank =

2023 receivership of an American commercial bank

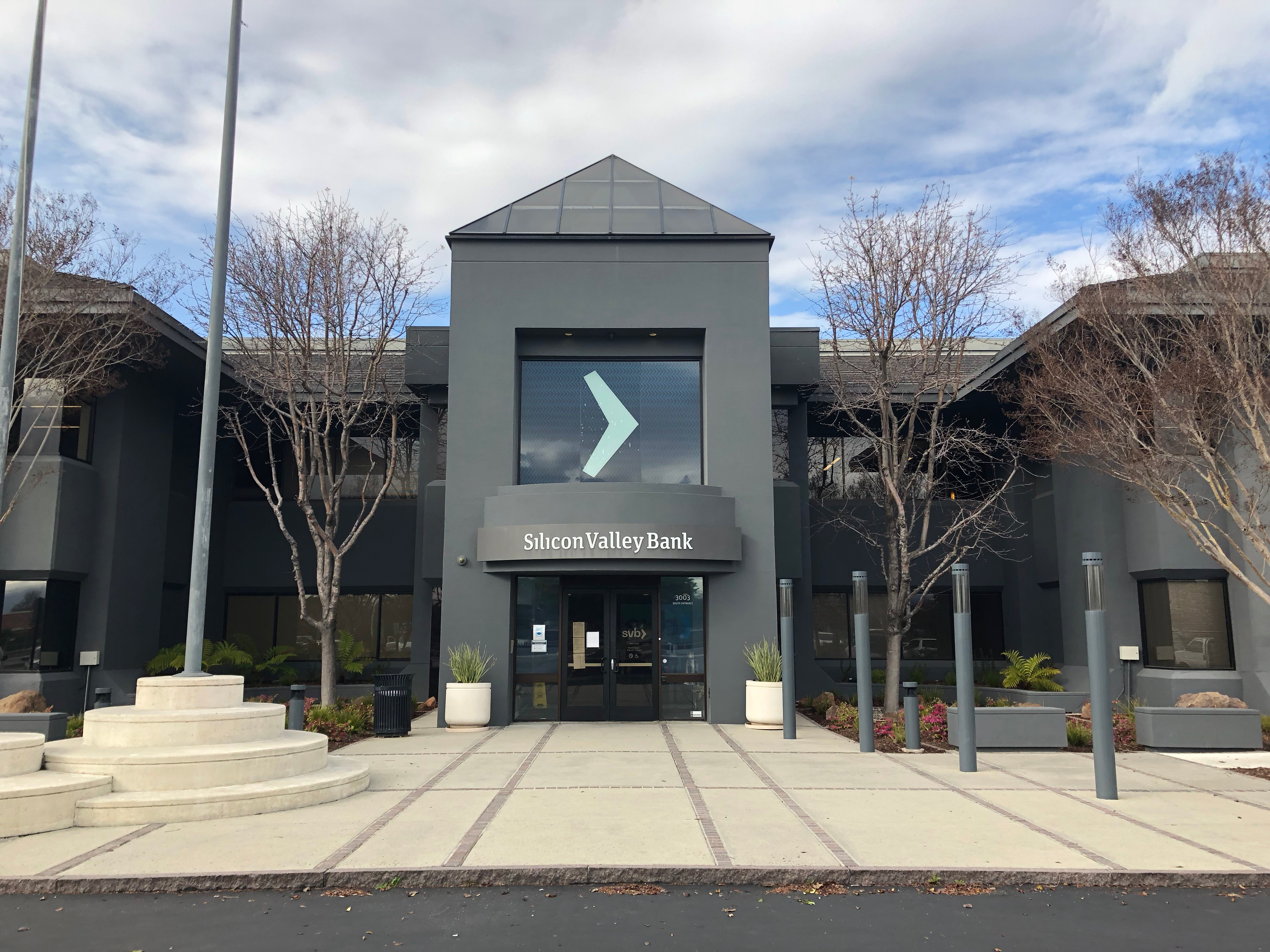
Silicon Valley Bank headquarters in Santa Clara, California, on March 13, 2023

On March 10, 2023, Silicon Valley Bank (SVB) failed after a bank run, marking the third-largest bank failure in United States history and the largest since the 2008 financial crisis. It was one of three bank failures, along with Silvergate Bank and Signature Bank, in March 2023 in the United States.

Seeking higher investment returns from its burgeoning deposits, SVB had dramatically increased its holdings of long-term securities since 2021, accounting for them on a hold-to-maturity basis. The market value of these bonds decreased significantly through 2022 and into 2023 as the Federal Reserve raised interest rates to curb an inflation surge, causing unrealized losses on the portfolio. Higher interest rates also raised borrowing costs throughout the economy and some Silicon Valley Bank clients started pulling money out to meet their liquidity needs. To raise cash to pay withdrawals by its depositors, SVB announced on Wednesday, March 8 that it had sold over US$21 billion worth of securities, borrowed $15 billion, and would hold an emergency sale of some of its treasury stock to raise $2.25 billion. The announcement, coupled with warnings from prominent Silicon Valley investors, caused a bank run as customers withdrew funds totaling $42 billion by the following day.

On the morning of March 10, the California Department of Financial Protection and Innovation seized SVB and placed it under the receivership of the Federal Deposit Insurance Corporation (FDIC). An additional $100 billion were expected to be withdrawn during Friday. About 89 percent of the bank's $172 billion in deposit liabilities exceeded the maximum insured by the FDIC. Two days after the failure, the FDIC received exceptional authority from the Treasury and announced jointly with other agencies that all depositors would have full access to their funds the next morning. Seeking to auction off all or parts of the bank, the FDIC reopened it on Monday March 13 as a newly organized bridge bank, Silicon Valley Bridge Bank, N.A. Although some characterized the government response as a bailout, the plan did not entail rescuing the bank, its management or shareholders, but rather making uninsured depositors whole from the proceeds of selling the bank's assets, without the use of taxpayer money.

The collapse of SVB had significant consequences for startup companies in the U.S. and abroad, with many briefly unable to withdraw money from the bank. Other large technology companies, media companies, and wineries were also affected. For a number of founders and their venture capital backers, this was the bank of choice.

== Background ==
SVB was a commercial bank founded in 1983 and headquartered in Santa Clara, California. At its collapse, SVB was the 16th largest bank in the U.S. by total assets and was heavily skewed toward serving companies and individuals from the technology industry. Nearly half of U.S. venture capital-backed healthcare and technology companies were financed by SVB. Companies such as Airbnb, Cisco, Fitbit, Pinterest, and Block, Inc. have been clients of the bank. In addition to financing venture-backed companies, SVB was well known as a source of private banking, personal credit lines, and mortgages to tech entrepreneurs, and specialized lending money to higher-risk new companies. Silicon Valley Bank required an exclusive relationship of those borrowing from the bank. Prior to Thursday March 9, 2023, SVB was in "sound financial condition", according to the California Department of Financial Protection and Innovation, though an increased number of short sellers began to target SVB earlier in the year. Employees received their annual bonuses on March 10, 2023, hours before the government took control of the company.

As of the last call report of the bank, filed on December 31, 2022, it held $209 billion in total assets, with $175.5 billion in total deposits, of which the bank estimated $151.6 billion (86.4 percent) were uninsured.

== Collapse ==
=== Losses ===
The bank's deposits increased from $62 billion in March 2020 to $124 billion in March 2021, benefiting from the impact of the COVID-19 pandemic on science and technology. Most of these deposits were invested in long-term Treasury bonds as the bank sought a higher return on investment than was available on shorter-term bonds. These long-term bonds fell in current market value as interest rates rose during the 2021–2023 inflation surge and they became less attractive as investments relative to newer bond issues. In April 2022, SVB's chief risk officer stepped down, and a successor was not named until January 2023—a period coinciding with the period of interest rate increases.

At the end of 2022, the bank had a $117 billion bond portfolio, divided into a $91.3 billion held-to-maturity portfolio (meaning it was not marked to market and profits or losses would not be realized until maturity) and a $26 billion available-for-sale portfolio (which as the name implies was marked to market). At that point in time, its marked-to-market unrealized losses for securities held to maturity exceeded $15 billion. The bank did not hedge against interest rate risk on that part of its bond portfolio, apparently for the same reason that most banks do not: the hedge itself would bounce around with the market, while the point of holding bonds to maturity is to hold them at par. Most banks minimize interest rate risk in their held-to-maturity portfolios by buying shorter-term bonds. The bank did hedge against interest rate risk on its available-for-sale portfolio by building up a portfolio of $15.2 billion of interest rate swaps by the end of 2021.

At the same time, startup companies withdrew deposits from the bank to fund their operations as private financing became harder to come by. A series of layoffs in the technology sector that began in 2022 also caused depositors to draw down their savings. During the first half of 2022, the bank realized $517 million in gains by unwinding $11 billion of its interest rate swaps on its available-for-sale bond portfolio. By the end of the year, it had only $563 million in swaps protecting that portfolio. In early 2023, to raise needed cash to fund withdrawals, the bank sold all of its available-for-sale securities, realizing a $1.8 billion loss. The bank was criticized for timing its announcement shortly after Silvergate Bank, which catered to cryptocurrency users, started winding down its operations, and for not lining up private funding ahead of the announcement.

Some banking experts said that the bank would have managed its risks better had it not been for the Economic Growth, Regulatory Relief, and Consumer Protection Act (EGRRCPA), enacted in 2018 and supported by SVB CEO Greg Becker, which reduced the frequency and number of scenarios of required stress testing implemented under the Dodd–Frank Wall Street Reform and Consumer Protection Act for banks with under $250 billion in assets. The Federal Reserve Bank of San Francisco did have discretion to annually examine any bank with $100 billion in assets. In implementing the regulatory changes, Federal Reserve Vice Chair Randal Quarles also changed the Federal Reserve's bank supervisory culture, allegedly making routine supervision less intense and more predictable.

=== Instability ===
A 2021 Federal Reserve review of the bank found several deficiencies in its risk management procedures. The bank failed to fix six citations issued by the Fed and was placed under a full supervisory review in July 2022. In the autumn, San Francisco Fed officials met with SVB senior leaders to discuss the bank's ability to raise cash in a crisis and possible exposure to losses as interest rates rose. Fed officials determined the bank was using flawed models that led SVB officers to incorrectly believe rising interest rates would increase the bank's interest revenue to substantially stabilize its financial condition. By early 2023, the Fed placed SVB in a "horizontal review" of its risk management procedures.

In the week before the collapse, Moody's Investors Service reportedly informed SVB Financial, the bank's holding company, that it was facing a potential double-downgrade of its credit rating because of its unrealized losses. On March 8, 2023, SVB announced it had sold over $21 billion worth of its investments, borrowed $15 billion, and would hold an emergency sale of its stock to raise $2.25 billion, including $500 million to General Atlantic. JPMorgan Chase and Bank of America turned down opportunities to acquire the bank. Despite the steps taken by the bank, Moody's downgraded SVB on March 8.

Investors at several venture capital firms, including executives at Peter Thiel's Founders Fund, Union Square Ventures and Coatue Management urged their portfolio companies to withdraw their deposits from the bank, with Founders Fund withdrawing all of its funds from the bank by the morning of March 9. By the close of business that day, customers had withdrawn $42 billion, leaving the bank with a negative cash balance of about $958 million. Among the financial services companies receiving money from SVB customers were Brex, JPMorgan Chase, Morgan Stanley and First Republic Bank. The value of SVB's shares plummeted until a trading halt was implemented on the morning of March 10.

On February 27, SVB Financial Group CEO Greg Becker sold 12,451 shares of company stock, worth $3.6 million, through an executive trading plan that he filed with the SEC under Rule 10b5-1 on January 26. The rule has been criticized as a loophole allowing for insider trading. Beginning April 1, the SEC will require a minimum 90-day cooling period for most executive trading plans.

=== Receivership ===
The FDIC temporarily created the Deposit Insurance National Bank of Santa Clara (DINB) to distribute insured deposits before replacing it with a bridge bank.

On the morning of March 10, examiners from the Federal Reserve and the Federal Deposit Insurance Corporation (FDIC) arrived at the offices of SVB to assess the company's finances. Several hours later, the California Department of Financial Protection and Innovation seized SVB citing inadequate liquidity and insolvency, and placed it into the receivership of the FDIC. The failure of SVB was the largest by assets of any bank since the 2008 financial crisis and the second-largest failure of an FDIC-insured bank.

According to regulatory reports as of December 31, 2022, uninsured deposits were estimated to represent 89 percent of total deposits at the bank. With no other bank immediately offering to assume or guarantee them, the FDIC organized a Deposit Insurance National Bank of Santa Clara (DINB) to re-open the bank's branches the following Monday and enable access to insured deposits only. It announced that it would begin paying dividends for uninsured funds within the following week as SVB's assets were liquidated. Moody's Investor Service projected a recovery rate for uninsured depositors of 80–90 percent. The FDIC notified Silicon Valley Bank employees that they would be let go in 45 days' time; in the meantime, it offered salaried employees a 50% raise and hourly employees double pay for any overtime. The Federal Reserve Bank of San Francisco stated that the bank's CEO Greg Becker was no longer on its board of directors.

The simultaneous failures of SVB and New York's Signature Bank raised concern about the condition of other regional banks, with particular attention to First Republic Bank and Western Alliance. Faced with the possibility of a broader loss of confidence, on March 12 the Treasury granted the FDIC an exception allowing it to guarantee the uninsured deposits of both failed banks and to cover the expense through special assessments on other member banks. On March 13 the FDIC transferred SVB assets to a new bridge bank, Silicon Valley Bridge Bank, N.A., and appointed Tim Mayopoulos as CEO. The bridge bank consolidated insured and uninsured deposits into a single institution, making it more attractive to prospective buyers. There is a dispute about whether the U.S. government's guarantee to insure depositors in full, rather than just the $250,000 per account protected by law, qualifies as a bailout. President Joe Biden denied the term bailout applies in this particular case. Treasury Secretary Janet Yellen had already ruled out bailing out SVB.

Silicon Valley Bank's overseas subsidiaries held $13.9 billion in deposits. The Bank of England issued a statement that it sought a court order to place the United Kingdom subsidiary of the bank into a Bank Insolvency Procedure. Shanghai Pudong Development Bank issued a statement that its joint operations with SVB, chaired by its own Shanghai-based chairman, were not affected by the collapse as of March 11. Canadian regulator Office of the Superintendent of Financial Institutions (OSFI) temporarily seized control of SVB Canada on March 12. On March 15, OSFI took permanent control of the bank and announced it would restructure SVB Canada to a new bridge bank to be created by the FDIC, after the regulator was unable to find a buyer.

An initial auction of Silicon Valley Bank assets on March 12 attracted a single bid that was not from a bank, after PNC Financial Services and RBC Bank backed away from making offers. Bank of America, JPMorgan Chase, and Goldman Sachs all declined to make offers. The FDIC canceled the auction, scheduling a second to attract bids from major banks, after the systemic risk exception was granted. Mayopoulos urged venture capitalists and startups to keep their deposits in the bridge bank, apparently to improve its financial condition, and suggested that customers return some of the deposits they had recently pulled out of the bank as part of a diversification strategy. A group of venture capitalists called for depositors to keep at least half of their capital in the bank.

The seizure of Silicon Valley Bank's assets severely disrupted SVB Financial Group's operations. The holding company was locked out of its Santa Clara headquarters, which were shared with the bank, forcing it to move its headquarters to its New York City offices. The holding company, bridge bank, and FDIC are discussing how to reorganize payroll systems. All of SVB Financial Group's employees have been on the payroll of Silicon Valley Bank, not SVB Financial Group, while the parent company has been providing employee benefits to all Silicon Valley Bank employees. Some employees had split their time between the two companies.

SVB Financial Group began exploring a potential sale of the bank's sister companies SVB Capital and SVB Securities. The latter's founder, Jeffrey Leerink, expressed interest in buying back the firm. However, the finances of these companies are deeply intertwined with Silicon Valley Bank, which could complicate any sale. The company filed Chapter 11 bankruptcy one week after the bank's failure. A group including Centerbridge Partners, Davidson Kempner Capital Management, and PIMCO reportedly bought a stake in the company in anticipation of the bankruptcy.

According to FDIC chairman Martin J. Gruenberg, the estimated cost to the Deposit Insurance Fund to cover the bank's collapse was $20 billion – including $18 billion to cover uninsured deposits.

== Acquisition ==
HSBC UK announced on March 13, 2023, that it had agreed to acquire Silicon Valley Bank UK for £1, at no cost to taxpayers and with depositors fully protected.

On March 26, 2023, the FDIC announced that First Citizens BancShares will acquire the commercial banking business of SVB. As part of the deal, First Citizens will buy around $119 billion in deposits and $72 billion of SVB's loans discounted by $16.5 billion, while around $90 billion of SVB's securities will continue to remain in receivership. The FDIC received about $500 million-worth of equity appreciation rights linked to First Citizens' shares. SVB's 17 branches reopened as a division of First Citizens Bank the next day, with all SVB depositors becoming depositors of First Citizens. SVB Private was initially going to be auctioned separately but First Citizens acquired the business along with SVB. First Citizens was the 30th-largest bank in the United States, in terms of assets, at the end of 2022. After the acquisition, it is set to enter the top 20.

In April 2023, Centerview Partners began orchestrating an auction of SVB Securities. In June 2023, SVB Financial Group announced that it entered into an agreement to sell SVB Securities to a group led by Leerink.

== Effects ==
Experts initially did not expect SVB's collapse to pose a systemic risk to the U.S. financial system. However, although experts think these effects are temporary, the bank's collapse created hardships among some tech startups, and companies holding significant uninsured deposits and low cash flow faced significant risks.

=== Customers ===
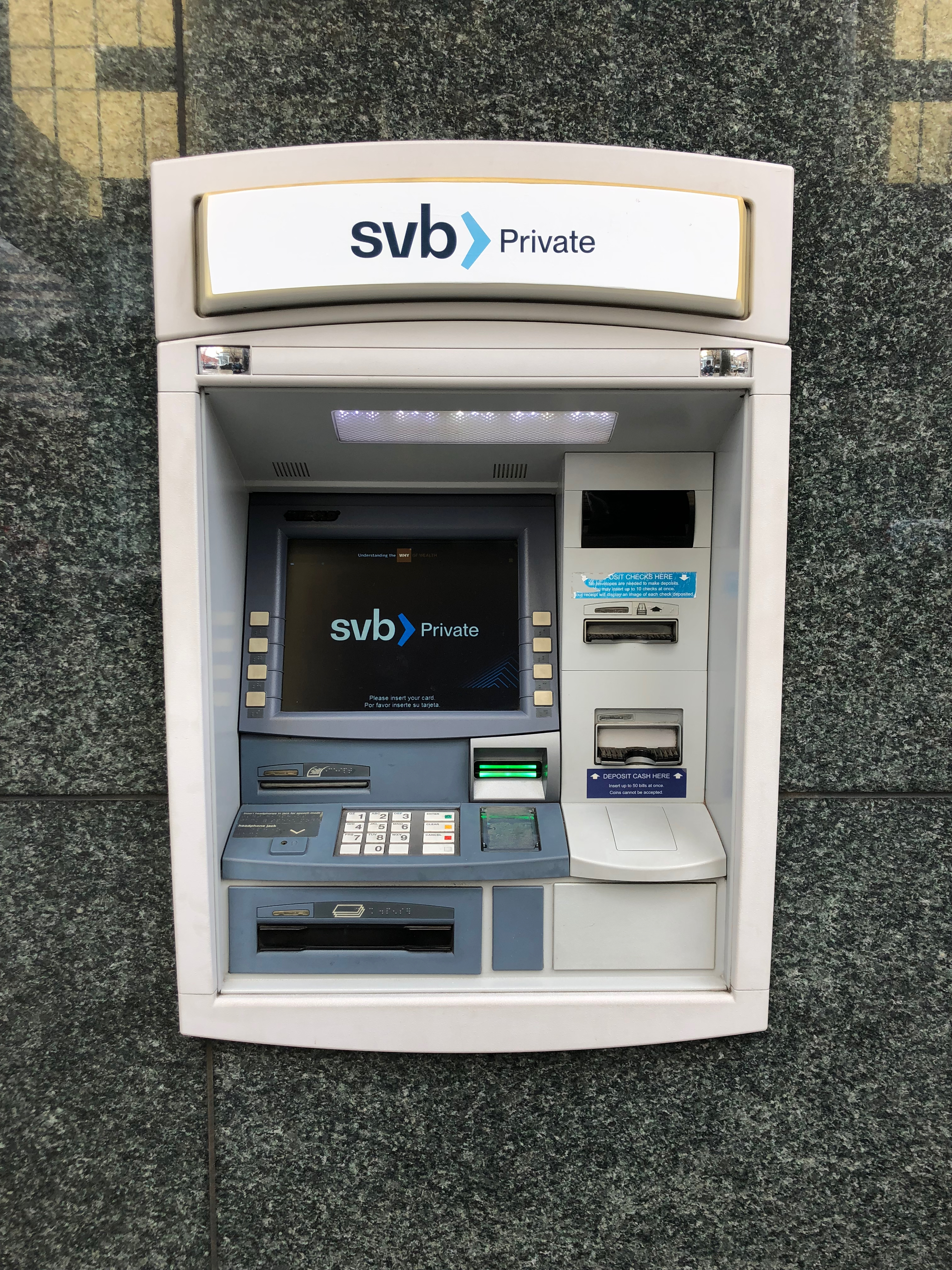
An SVB Private ATM in San Jose, California, on March 12, 2023

Many startups were unable to retrieve money, resulting in companies taking out loans to make payroll. Because California state law requires employees to be paid within a certain number of days, continued inability to access deposits could have caused a large number of startups to furlough workers, reduce their workforce through layoffs, or shut down entirely. The bank's collapse also reduces available funding for startups on the venture debt market, which has grown in importance as venture capital firms have dramatically scaled back their investments. E-commerce company Etsy was forced to delay seller payouts; the company used SVB to send out deposits to some sellers. The bank's collapse coincided with the beginning of the annual, startup-oriented South by Southwest Interactive conference in Austin, Texas. Aside from some disruption caused by SVB credit cards, attendees maintained an air of calm during the event. In the days after the collapse, startup founders and other customers lined up outside bank branches in Silicon Valley and San Francisco, seeking to withdraw their deposits or learn the status of their wire transfers. Many technology entrepreneurs regained access to their deposits on March 13.

In a Securities and Exchange Commission (SEC) filing, streaming media company Roku, Inc. revealed that around a quarter of the company's cash reserves—$487 million—were held by SVB. Other companies affected by the collapse include video game developer Roblox Corporation, video hosting service Vimeo, and payroll processor, Rippling. More than 1,500 climate change–related technology startups had taken out loans or had lines of credit with Silicon Valley Bank. The failure came at a sensitive time when many such startups were scaling up to meet expected demand from the Inflation Reduction Act of 2022.

Outside the technology startup space, Vox Media and BuzzFeed had its cash concentrated at the bank, and Vox Media saw its SVB-issued credit cards stop working. The California wine industry was also affected by SVB's collapse, since it was a leading regional winery banker. Some Oregon wineries were also affected. The bank's premium wine division had about $1.1 billion in outstanding loans to about 400 clients. California Governor Gavin Newsom's wine companies were among the bank's clients. Businessman Mark Cuban reportedly had millions in the bank, along with his side venture Cost Plus Drugs.

Since 2002, the bank had made $2.7 billion in loans and investments, including $1.6 billion in loans since 2014, to build nearly 10,000 units of affordable housing in Silicon Valley and San Francisco, as well as affordable housing in Massachusetts (from its 2021 acquisition of Boston Private). The collapse left 11 projects in the San Francisco Bay Area in limbo, plus two more in Los Angeles and the Central Valley. Housing advocates predicted delays and difficulty assembling funding. Some nonprofit organizations expect to deal with fallout from the bank's collapse for months. As a legacy of SVB's Boston Private acquisition, it provided free banking services to many nonprofits in San Mateo County, California, who have needed to redirect donations to alternative bank accounts.

Ahmad Thomas, CEO of the Silicon Valley Leadership Group, of which the bank was a member, described the failure as a setback for the San Francisco Bay Area's startup ecosystem and noted that it would be difficult to replicate the bank's business model.

=== Shareholders ===
Silicon Valley Bank's holding company, SVB Financial Group, was a component of the S&P 500. At the time of the collapse, its largest shareholders included The Vanguard Group, BlackRock, and State Street Corporation, which owned the stock in large exchange traded funds that track the performance of S&P 500. The South Korean National Pension Service owned 100,000 shares in SVB's holding company, SVB Financial Group. CalPERS (California state pension fund) held about $67 million in bonds to the bank, or less than two percent of one percent of total investments, as of June 2022.

On March 13, shares of similar regional banks, including First Republic Bank, Western Alliance Bancorporation, and PacWest Bancorp plummeted.

=== Financial system ===
Market capitalization of U.S. banks lost a combined $100 billion in two days and European banks lost $50 billion. SVB's losses highlighted the challenge that banks could face as interest rate increases reduced the market value of bonds that they purchased under low-rate policies. Some companies have sought safety with larger commercial banks, transferring their deposits out from regional banks similar to Silicon Valley Bank, raising concerns about further instability in the banking sector. Several banks, such as First Republic Bank and Western Alliance Bancorporation, issued press releases seeking to calm investors.

Despite these concerns, banking experts believe that other banks will remain stable as SVB was overly specialized in providing banking to a risky sector of the economy, and financial regulations have strengthened since the 2008 financial crisis, which preceded the Great Recession. SVB had, in 2021, reached the threshold under the Dodd-Frank Act requiring it to submit a resolution plan ("living will") to the FDIC, which it did the following year. It had not participated in periodic stress testing under the act, as the threshold for that requirement had been raised in 2018 under EGRRCPA; SVB's chief executive was among those requesting the change.

On March 12, 2023, Signature Bank was also closed, being taken into possession by the New York State Department of Financial Services. Following the bank failures, the Federal Reserve announced the creation of a Bank Term Funding Program to shore up liquidity for other at-risk banks.

Circle, a peer-to-peer payments technology company that issues the stablecoin USD Coin (USDC), attested that SVB is one of the six banking partners used by the company to manage its cash reserves for USDC, with $3.3 billion (approximately 8%) of its cash reserves held there. USDC's price fell below its US$1 pegged exchange rate during trading on March 10 and 11, causing Coinbase to halt conversions between USDC and U.S. dollars. USDC had recovered most of the losses after Circle assured investors that the peg would remain honored.

Investors and economists believed that the SVB collapse and other recent bank failures might prevent a previously expected Federal Reserve interest rate increase on March 22. However, a rate increase was still approved.

The failure complicates an ongoing lobbying effort by large banks against the Federal Reserve's requirement that they hold cash equivalents to government-backed securities, such as the Treasury bonds that Silicon Valley Bank invested in.

=== Legal actions ===
On April 28, the Federal Reserve Board of Governors released a postmortem investigation by Vice Chair for Supervision Michael Barr into supervision and regulation of the bank. It focused on lax oversight of SVB during the tenure of his predecessor, Randal Quarles, and called for a reevaluation of the rules for mid-sized banks. The U.S. Securities and Exchange Commission and U.S. Department of Justice have reportedly opened investigations into the bank's financial disclosures and executives' recent trading plans.

On March 13, an SVB shareholder filed a Securities Class Action against the company in the U.S. District Court for the Northern District of California, alleging fraud for false statements made by executives and the bank.

Senator Elizabeth Warren of Massachusetts introduced legislation, cosponsored by about 50 Democrats in the Senate and House of Representatives, that would roll back some provisions of the EGRRCPA, including regular stress testing. The Senate Committee on Banking, Housing, and Urban Affairs held a hearing on March 28 regarding the bank failures that focused on the Federal Reserve's oversight of banks. Former CEO Gregory W. Becker did not attend the hearing; Senators Sherrod Brown and Tim Scott have asked him to appear before the committee at a later hearing.

== Reactions ==
=== Official responses ===
U.S. President Joe Biden discussed the collapse with California Governor Gavin Newsom on March 11. In televised remarks from the White House before markets opened on March 13, Biden expressed confidence in the resilience of the banking system, pledged that the government would ensure the availability of deposits without rewarding investors with taxpayer funds, and promised to hold bank executives accountable and propose rule changes to prevent future failures. National Credit Union Administration board members emphasized the safety of the credit union system in contrast to the banking system, but reiterated the importance of effective risk management, including the use of interest rate derivatives, and urged Congress to strengthen the Central Liquidity Facility.

Israeli Prime Minister Benjamin Netanyahu pledged to take steps to help Israeli technology companies get through the liquidity crisis. Indian IT minister Rajeev Chandrasekhar met with companies to assess the effect on India's startup community. UK Prime Minister Rishi Sunak, Japanese Chief Cabinet Secretary Hirokazu Matsuno, and South Korea's Financial Services Commission each downplayed any systemic risk to their countries' financial sectors.

In 2025, the United States Senate’s Permanent Subcommittee on Investigations’ released a comprehensive 292 page report about the bank collapse. The report called out inadequate practices by KPMG, which was the auditor of Silicon Valley Bank, Signature Bank and First Republic Bank at the time each organization failed in 2023.

=== Debate over government intervention ===
A group of 599 venture capitalists, including Garry Tan and David O. Sacks, along with hedge fund manager Bill Ackman and California State Senator Scott Wiener, called for a government intervention to protect uninsured depositors. Representatives Ruben Gallego of Arizona and Eric Swalwell of California called for depositors to be made whole, while Representatives Ro Khanna and Brad Sherman of California called on the Treasury Department and FDIC to affirm that depositors would be protected so they could make payroll. Khanna pointed to the 1991 collapse of the Bank of New England as precedent for rescuing a regional bank. Representative Matt Gaetz of Florida and Republican presidential candidates Nikki Haley and Vivek Ramaswamy expressed opposition to any taxpayer-funded bailout of the bank. Ramaswamy suggested that the FDIC's deposit insurance limit be raised instead. San Jose Mayor Matt Mahan also called the $250,000 limit "arcane".

Governor Newsom, Senator Kyrsten Sinema of Arizona, and Representative Anna Eshoo of California applauded the FDIC's announcement that it would protect depositors without affecting taxpayers via the Bank Term Funding Program. Mayor Mahan criticized the federal government's response to the bank's failure as slow and indicative of its misunderstanding of Silicon Valley startups' contribution to the national economy. Senators Elizabeth Warren of Massachusetts and Bill Hagerty of Tennessee criticized regulators for protecting large depositors, including some of the venture capital firms that triggered the bank run. Republican lawmakers and financial policy experts criticized the emergency actions as a bailout that could create a moral hazard at other banks. Senator JD Vance of Ohio questioned whether the federal government would have taken similar action for a smaller bank or credit union. Economist Paul Krugman compared the failure and resulting government action to the savings and loan crisis. Economist Dean Baker contrasted the broad agreement behind rescuing relatively sophisticated Silicon Valley business proprietors with the objections over moral hazard and personal responsibility to President Biden's student loan forgiveness program. San Jose Chamber of Commerce CEO Derrick Seaver said any moral hazard was worth staving off the potential risk of allowing depositors to go unprotected.

According to some experts, the government's quick reaction to the failure of Silicon Valley Bank, which had been viewed as having little significance outside of the technology sector until its failure, showed a fragile system addicted to injections of official support. Senator Warren, Representative Khanna, and Mayor Mahan called for earnings from CEO Greg Becker's recent sale of SVB shares to be clawed back and returned to depositors. Representative Eshoo criticized the last-minute bonuses given to bank employees as "highly offensive".

=== Debate about causes ===
Michael Barr, vice chair for supervision at the Federal Reserve, stated during Senate testimony that it was a "textbook case of bank mismanagement". He testified that "SVB failed because the bank's management did not effectively manage its interest rate and liquidity risk, and the bank then suffered a devastating and unexpected run by its uninsured depositors in a period of less than 24 hours". He also said that Federal Reserve supervisors had begun issuing warnings as early as November 2021, and that the bank failed to take the necessary actions to correct the issues in a timely manner.

An official report from the FDIC and Federal Reserve noted deregulation and reduced enforcement of remaining regulations allowed mismanagement of the bank to cause its failure.

Cryptocurrency proponents cited the collapse in support of a decentralized monetary system. Others in the tech sector proposed that recent events in the cryptocurrency business, such as the bankruptcy of FTX and the exit of cryptocurrency-focused banks, had conditioned depositors to panic and noted that the FDIC's limited guarantee had no parallel in cryptocurrency.

Senator Warren, Representative Khanna, and Senator Bernie Sanders of Vermont argued that the bank's failure could have been avoided by the stress testing that was required of banks of SVB's size until the passage of the EGRRCPA; they called for the law to be repealed and criticized Becker for having supported it. Warren and Senator Richard Blumenthal of Connecticut asked the Department of Justice and Securities and Exchange Commission to investigate whether senior bank executives had violated any laws.

Senator John Kennedy of Louisiana criticized regulators for lax oversight of the bank. The Bank Policy Institute, which represents large banks, contended that the failures of SVB and Signature Bank were primarily caused by failures of management and supervision, rather than regulation, and stressed its members' resiliency.

Several Republicans and conservative commentators argued that the bank failed because it was "woke" and distracted by its workforce diversity efforts, which are typical of mid-sized and large banks in the U.S. Florida Governor Ron DeSantis, Representative Marjorie Taylor Greene of Georgia, and Tucker Carlson tied the bank's failure to its diversity, equity, and inclusion (DEI) program. Greene and Representative James Comer of Kentucky cited the bank's environmental, social, and corporate governance investment program. Senator Tim Scott of South Carolina implied that the San Francisco Fed overlooked risks at the bank due to a shared focus on climate change. Andy Kessler suggested that the presence of minorities and military veterans on the bank's board of directors served as a distraction. The New York Post blamed the DEI efforts of a manager at the UK subsidiary for the risks that arose in the U.S. An allegation spread in conservative media that SVB had donated over $73 million to the "BLM Movement & Related Causes," citing a database that had been created by a conservative organization to purportedly show "who funded the BLM riots". Analysis by Talking Points Memo found the database actually showed corporate donations to a variety of diversity programs that had no apparent relationship to the Black Lives Matter movement. The Associated Press also investigated claims that the collapse was caused by a "woke agenda" and found that there was no evidence to support the claims. Representative Nancy Mace of South Carolina criticized other members of Congress for politicizing the bank's failure and urged caution in making public comments that could affect the market.

== See also ==
- Acquisition of Credit Suisse by UBS
- Bank regulation in the United States
- Deposit insurance
- List of bank failures in the United States (2008–present)
