= Faster Bay Area =

Faster Bay Area is a November 2020 ballot measure proposed by a coalition of business lobbying groups to raise up to $100 billion over 40 years for transportation projects in the San Francisco Bay Area. Similar to the 2018 Regional Measure 3, the tax would require a bill to be passed by the California State Legislature authorizing its placement on ballots in all nine Bay Area counties. According to Silicon Valley Leadership Group (SVLG) CEO Carl Guardino, the goal of the tax is "to build a seamlessly integrated world-class transit system that serves the transit-dependent and lures the non-transit dependent out of their vehicles.”

== History ==
The proponents of Faster Bay Area, Silicon Valley Leadership Group, Bay Area Council, and the San Francisco Bay Area Planning and Urban Research Association (SPUR) were inspired by the passage of similar very large transportation taxes in Los Angeles (Measure M) and Seattle (ST3) in November 2016, and began meeting in January 2017 to formulate such a tax for the Bay Area. In December 2017 this business coalition announced that it would seek to place the tax proposal on Bay Area ballots in 2020, and that the measure would focus on creating transit hubs to connect major cities around the region by rail, building public transit options in communities that are currently underserved and expanding rail, bus and ferry networks. The business coalition hired SCN Strategies, now SCRB Strategies, a political campaign firm also employed by Governor Gavin Newsom and U.S. Senator Kamala Harris in their successful bids for elected office, to manage the Faster Bay Area campaign.

== Projects ==
Proponents of Faster Bay Area have provided few details on which projects the tax increase would actually fund, though high-cost highway and rail transit expansions have been the most frequently cited. The only "project list" so far provided at any public meeting is in fact a short list of project categories, presented by Valley Transportation Authority (VTA) Policy & Community Relations Manager Scott Haywood at the June 21 VTA Board of Directors. That list envisions $36 billion, mostly highway traffic capacity expansion projects, for Santa Clara County, and does not consider any projects in other Bay Area counties.

== Polls ==
Polls conducted in February 2019 and commissioned by SVLG showed strong general support for the tax measure, with 71 percent of respondents indicating support for a one-percent sales tax to generate the $100 billion envisioned, and 64 percent of respondents supporting a $50 billion bond plus a 0.4 percent gross receipts tax on businesses. However, SVLG has been widely criticized for politically-motivated "push polling" for years, and was found to have overestimated support for the proposed 2020 Caltrain sales tax by 9 percentage points in May 2019.

== Public review ==
Despite the huge dollar amount and scope of the envisioned tax, Faster Bay Area has seen very little public review as of June 2019. The proposal was reviewed at a retreat of the Alameda County Transportation Commission (ACTC) on May 30, 2019, by the Valley Transportation Authority (VTA) Board of Directors on June 6, 2019, and on June 13, 2019 by the Bay Area Rapid Transit (BART) District Board of Directors.

== See also ==
- Measure R
