= Bay Area Climate Collaborative =

US Climate Change organization

- Established: March 6, 2009; 17 years ago
- Headquarters: San Jose, California, US
- Members: Around 35 businesses, governments and non-profit organizations
- Director: Rafael Reyes
- Website: web.archive.org/web/20160109110721/http://baclimate.org/

The Bay Area Climate Collaborative (BACC) is an initiative of the Silicon Valley Leadership Group through its Sustainable Valley Foundation. It was established on March 6, 2009. The former mayors of San Francisco (Gavin Newsom), San Jose (Chuck Reed) and Oakland (Ron Dellums) launched and with business and civic leaders. The BACC created a 10-point action plan including initiatives in solar energy, energy efficiency, electric vehicles, and green jobs.

== History ==
The Bay Area Climate Collaborative (BACC) was founded on March 6, 2009, at the signing of the Bay Area Climate Compact. The signing ceremony was held in Redwood City at Silver Spring Networks, and was attended by leaders of local governments, agencies, businesses, and members of the press.

Partners at time of launch included:

- City of Oakland
- City of San Francisco
- City of San Jose
- Silicon Valley Leadership Group
- Bay Area Council
- Joint Venture Silicon Valley

In 2015, the Bay Area Climate Collaborative became part of Prospect Silicon Valley, an innovation hub for urban sustainability solutions based in San Jose.

== Compact ==
In 2006, The Bay Area Climate Compact (BACC) was signed by the cities of San Francisco, San Jose, and Oakland. The compact states that cities commit to creating a public-private identity that best serves the region, its municipalities, institutions, and communities to meet the state of California's goals for reducing greenhouse gas emissions (Global Warming Solutions Act of 2006). The compact also stated its dedication to helping Bay Area communities prepare for and adapt to the impacts of climate change.

As of August 2010, 15 regional municipalities had signed the Bay Area Climate Compact.
