= Financial services in Japan =

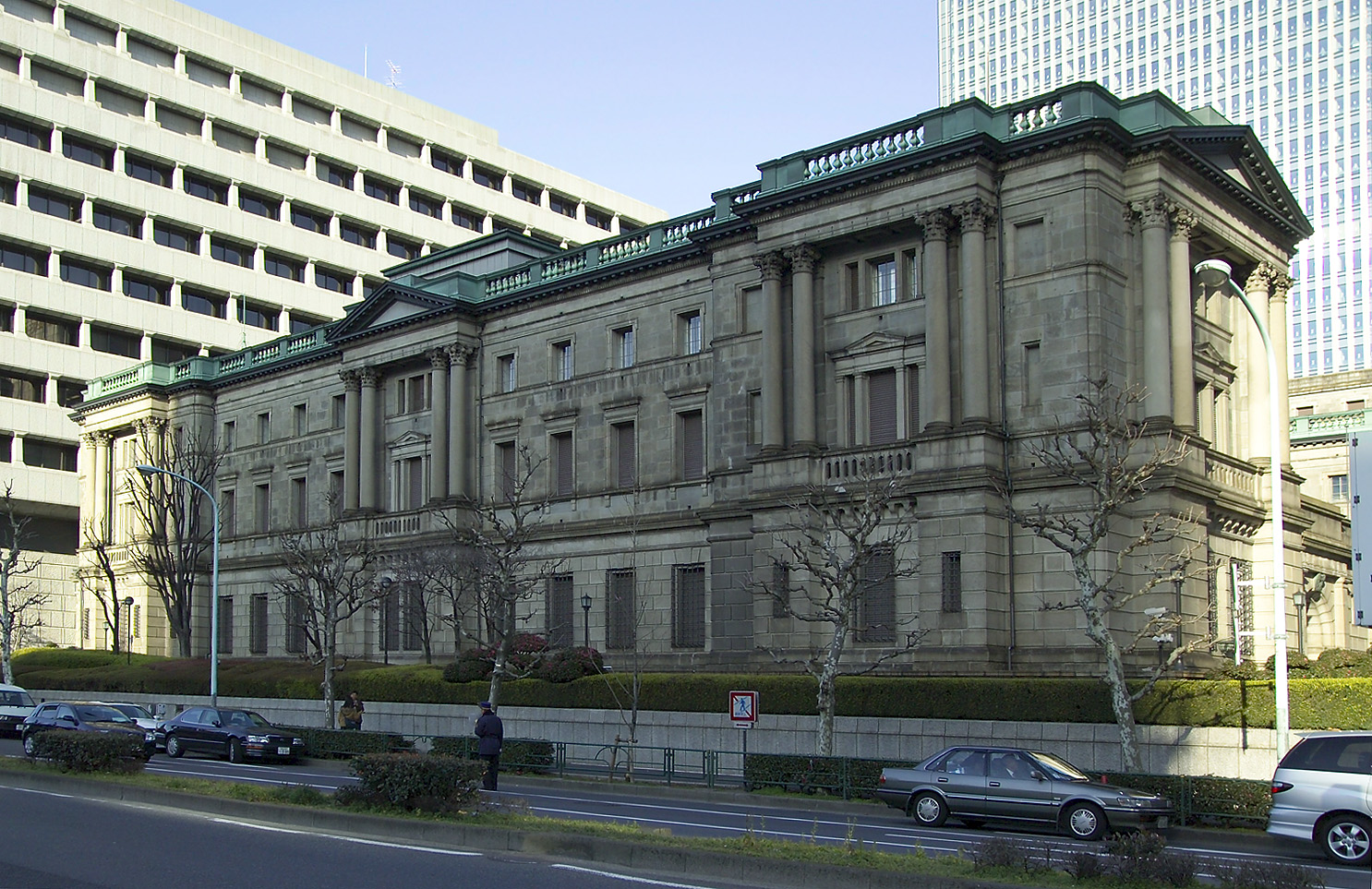
This is a photo of the Bank of Japan's headquarters in Tokyo, Japan.

The industry which has a range of businesses that deal with money like banks, insurance companies, accounting companies, finance companies, taxation, investment funds, credit companies, and few government enterprises is called the finance industry. The activities or services within this industry that cater to the economy of the country are called financial services. Therefore, the economic services provided by the finance industry in Japan are called financial services in Japan. These services are present across the world, at regional, international and national level developed economic and demographic regions such as Sydney, New York, London, Tokyo, etc.

Japan being one of the worlds' major industrialised countries, its major financial bodies are commercial banks, Japan also has foreign exchange companies, securities, and capital markets. The government-owned institutions inject funds into the economy and money markets for liquidity and also help the Bank of Japan to apply the monetary policy.

== History of Japanese currency and Currency exchange ==
The currency of Japan is Japanese Yen, and the Japanese Yen to European pound exchange rate is the most popular. JPY is the code of the currency and ¥ is the symbol of the Japanese Yen. The minor unit of Japanese Yen is 1/100 which is called a Sen. The central bank rate is -0.10. JPY's inflation rate is 0.50% presently (subject to change as the market is constantly changing). The currency denominations in coins are ¥1, ¥5, ¥10, ¥50, ¥100, ¥500 and the notes are ¥1000, ¥5000, ¥10000 and ¥2000 which is rarely used. Japan's central bank is the Bank of Japan. Japanese Yen is the most traded currency in Asia, and third in the world the reason being its relative lower interest rates. When a currency with a low-interest rate is sold to buy a currency with a higher rate of interest it is called a carry trade. Therefore, the Japanese Yen is mostly used to carry trade with the U.S. Dollar and the Australian Dollar.

Currency exchange counters can be found in almost every major airport. Japan is a cash-based society and value a weighted wallet. However, you can use an international credit card for transactions like taxis, train tickets, and few other services

== Banking ==
Banks form the major and most important part of the financial services of Japan. The Banking system in Japan can be divided into commercial banking system and Investment banking system.

=== Commercial banking ===
The commercial banking industry is deal more directly in terms of saving and lending of money whereas the financial services also have insurance, risk distribution, investments, etc. the commercial banking sector issues debit and credit cards, keeps deposits and lends money to the general public. It largely deals with the general public. The main revenue system of the banks would be through the interest rates on the credits, fees, commission, and rates paid to the depositors.

=== Investment banking ===
The investment banks facilitate buying and selling stocks, wealth management, and tax advice, merger and acquisition advice, etc. These banks are usually not for the general public but the high net worth customers and high deal-making institutions.

The Japanese banking system is quite stable as the banks' liquidity, asset risk and environment outweigh any other negative factors. There are about 200 banks in Japan. The Bank of Japan controls the domestic money supply and inject money as a last resort to the banks. City banks, regional banks, and trust banks are domestically licensed banks in Japan and there are many foreign banks as well.

=== Major banks in Japan ===
Mitsubishi UFJ Financial group – this group has been founded in 1880, its main operations are done through retail banking, corporate banking, trust assets, and global business groups. It has an asset of US$2901 billion and US$14 billion of income as of 2016. It has an employee strength of 140000 and is present in 50 countries across the world.

Japan Post Bank – this bank serves the corporate and retail clients in Japan and across the world. It has an asset of US$714.4 billion and US$3 billion of income as of 2016.

Mizuho Financial Group – this bank provides financial and banking services through various business sectors like the retail and business; corporate and institutional; global markets, etc. It has an asset of US$400 billion and US$5 billion of profit as of 2016.

Likewise, there are other city, regional, and trust banks that provide various services in the banking industry of Japan like Sumitomo Mitsui Financial Group, Norinchukin Bank, Resona Holdings, Concordia Financial Group, Fukuoka Financial Group, Chiba Bank and Hokuhoku Financial Group, etc.

However, according to the report on the Financial Services of Japan 2019/2020, banks' earning power has been lacking in Japan, the city banks are not rising so banks are accelerating the business model to be rebuilt for businesses.

Japanese law defines several types of financial institutions:

- The central bank (Japanese: 中央銀行), currently the Bank of Japan.
- Commercial banks (Japanese: 市中銀行), divided into three types:
  - Long-term credit banks (Japanese: 長期信用銀行), a defunct classification
  - Trust banks (Japanese: 信託銀行)
  - Ordinary banks (Japanese: 普通銀行), divided into four types:
    - Money center banks (Japanese: 都市銀行), those headquartered in Tokyo or Osaka and serving the entire country of Japan. Following the industry consolidation of the 1990s, this sector currently consists of three "megabanks" (Bank of Tokyo Mitsubishi UFJ, Sumitomo Mitsui Banking Corporation and Mizuho Financial Group) and three smaller banks (Aozora Bank, Resona Holdings and Shinsei Bank)
    - Regional banks (Japanese: 地方銀行)
    - Secondary regional banks (Japanese: 第二地方銀行)
    - Other banks, comprising a number of unofficial categories including:
      - Direct banks (Japanese: ネット銀行)
      - Local retail subsidiaries of foreign banks (Citibank and Shinhan Bank)
- Other government-chartered banks, which include:
  - Japan Post Bank
  - Development Bank of Japan
  - Bridge banks (Japanese: 承継銀行), entities temporarily established by the government to take over the operations of failed bank.

Both Japanese and foreign citizens may apply for an international ATM card corresponding to an interbank network such as Cirrus or PLUS. Foreign citizens need to show the Alien Registration Card for account creation.

Interbank ATMs are common throughout the country, especially in densely populated urban areas.

== Issues in the Japanese financial sector ==
=== Skill development policies ===
Due to the 2008 financial crisis, the skill development programs initiated by the firms specifically have been drastically reduced. Also, because the Japanese financial institutions have long skill training sessions, the employee attendance ratio has decreased due to which the institutions now have to hire only a few employees.

=== The female labour force in the Japan labour market ===
Significant attention has been given to the female employees as there were labour shortages and aged society. The financial sector uses female labour more than any sector in Japan. In the financial sector as there is more female labour under the age of 34–44. However, in this age group, female regular employees decline due to maternity reasons. Therefore, financial institutions might need to assist female workers in the workplace to continue their jobs even after their maternity period.

=== The mental health of the financial sector employees ===
Compared to other sectors like construction, manufacturing, education, and healthcare, etc., the financial sector has more prevailing mental health issues. It has been noticed that the number of workers with mental health issues has been increasing in Japan and especially in the financial services sector. Therefore, employee's mental health issues must be discussed and managed properly because these issues cost a lot as the financial services sector recruit employees for lengthy periods.

=== Work–life balance and management practices ===
As long working hours are prevalent in Japan financial institutions, the female employees beyond 30 years of age are lower in number. There is a huge difference in working hours of male and female employees, few male employees work around 180 – 200 hours a month and female employees work less than 140 hours a month on a non-regular or temporary basis employment. These distributions show us that women tend to avoid working on a regular employee basis as they need to work very long to compete with male colleagues in Japanese firms.

The management should redesign their practices and environment to allow working few hours and adding value to the financial services, to utilise the abilities, skills, and knowledge of women employees. The firms can support assessing the employees on the work and value they are adding instead of the number of working hours to retain and support the talent force in the workplace regardless of considering any genders to improve work–life balance.

== Insurance ==
Due to the Great East Japan Earthquake, the 2008 financial crisis and the September 11 attacks, in the financial years of 2001–02, 2008, and 2011, the Japanese insurance industry has shown losses. However, except these years, it has shown extraordinary performance since 2000 while earning net and ordinary profits every year. Besides these, the Japanese insurance core underwriting operations have not been very great and profitable.

In Japan, the demographic variations, the likelihood of an increase in frequent natural disasters, consumer behaviour change responses are a few of the changing factors in the insurance industry environments of Japan. These changes imply that the future of the insurance industry business can be sustained by the personalisation of insurance industry products, building a cross-sectoral ecosystem, and tackling the challenges in redesigning the human role in the insurance industry.

The Japan insurance industry is amongst the world's largest insurance markets, with its volume of 35 trillion Japanese Yen which bags the second position after the United States in the annual premium. As the ageing population is rising, birth rates lowering and the interest rates also lowering the life and non-life insurances face tremendous challenges in the market of Japan.

The life insurance market of Japan ranks the 3rd in the World in its size as 90% of the Japanese carry life insurance policies. It ranks after the U.S. and China. The volume of enforced policies has dropped when it reached a peak of 1.5 trillion in the late 1990s due to the decline in the taskforce population or put the other way as the ageing population started increasing.

Life insurance users can be benefitted by the insurance firms focusing on current profitable products' customers, creating more value-adding services and products which cater to a wide variety of diverse customers, developing models to increase customer's value of lifetime, considering preparing the products that would be available on e-commerce platforms by partnering in future and using the artificial intelligence, big data and cloud technologies to increase the efficiency and flexibility of functions and operations.

== Foreign companies and banks in Japan ==
There are over 50 foreign banks in Japan, including Citibank, JPMorgan Chase, HSBC, Deutsche Bank, Credit Suisse, ABN AMRO, ING Group.

There are several foreign financial services companies and banks assisting Japan's financial services industry. Few of those companies include KPMG, Deloitte, PwC, etc., and banks including Bank of China, Bank of Taiwan, etc. For example:

KPMG - KPMG in Japan with its experience in assisting various financial organisations in and outside of Japan helps its clients to prosper in their business goals in and out of the Japanese market. Its services include audit & assurance, legal, risk, financial, consulting, and tax advisory, etc.

Deloitte - Deloitte specialists assist the Japanese industry in a comprehensive and integrated way to tackle various challenges in the audit & assurance, legal, risk, financial advisory, consulting, and tax areas, providing solutions to customer challenges.

PwC in Japan provides services including risk analysis, pricing, tax advisory, consulting, and mergers and acquisitions advisory in the financial services sector.

Japan's financial market has around 50 foreign banks operating. ANZ, National Australia Bank, and Commonwealth Bank are some of the Australian banks having their operations in Japan which are located in the Japan's capital Tokyo and few of their branches extend to Osaka as well. In terms of international banking, bank transfer is the most popular and best way to send money to the outside of Japan. This process can be done both at a bank and online as well. Japan's customs department must be notified in case of a transaction over 1 million Japanese Yen is being processed.

== See also ==
- Economy of Japan
- List of banks in Japan
- Loans in Japan
