= New Frontier Bank =

American financial company

- Industry: Finance
- Founded: 1998
- Defunct: 2009
- Headquarters: Greeley, Colorado, United States
- Products: retail banking, mortgage banking, and business finance
- Website: www.newfrontierbank.com

New Frontier Bank was a financial company engaged primarily in retail banking, mortgage banking, business finance and providing ATM and merchant processing services. The bank was established in December 1998. The Bank had full service banking offices serving Greeley, and Windsor, Colorado.

On April 10, 2009, regulators shut down New Frontier Bank — the second Colorado bank to collapse in 2009, and the 23rd U.S. bank to fail in 2009.

== See also ==
- List of largest U.S. bank failures
