= Timothy Mayopoulos =

American businessman and lawyer (born 1959)

- Born: Timothy J. Mayopoulos; March 7, 1959 (age 67)
- Education: Cornell University; New York University School of Law (JD)
- Occupations: businessman and lawyer
- Title: President, Blend
- Term: 2019-
- Spouses: Amy Lefkof; Heather J. Russell
- Children: 2 children; 2 step-children

Timothy J. Mayopoulos (born March 7, 1959) is an American businessman and lawyer who was the president and chief executive officer (CEO) of Fannie Mae from 2016 to 2019. Following the collapse of Silicon Valley Bank in March 2023, he was appointed by the FDIC as CEO of its successor, Silicon Valley Bridge Bank, N.A. Mayopoulos was announced as president and member of the board of directors at Blend in 2019.

During his career, he was the general counsel of Bank of America and also worked at Deutsche Bank, Credit Suisse First Boston and Donaldson, Lufkin & Jenrette.

== Early life ==
Mayopoulos was born on March 7, 1959, to Harry B. Mayopoulos and his wife Eleanor Ida (Raifsnider) Mayopoulos. His Greek-American father was an avionics technician, union organizer and United Auto Workers member. His mother worked part-time at a Sears store.

He received a bachelor's degree in English from Cornell University in 1980 and a Juris Doctor from the New York University School of Law in 1984.

== Career ==
=== Legal career ===
After law school, Mayopoulos clerked for William C. Conner of the U.S. District Court for the Southern District of New York (1984-1986). He then worked for the law firm Davis Polk & Wardwell (1986-1994), before serving on the Whitewater investigation as part of the Office of the Independent Counsel (1994-1996).

From 1996-2000, Mayopoulos was managing director and associate general counsel at Donaldson, Lufkin & Jenrette He served as managing director and senior deputy general counsel at Americas of Credit Suisse First Boston (2000-2001) and as managing director and general counsel for Americas of Deutsche Bank AG's Corporate and Investment Bank (2002-2004). He became executive vice president and general counsel of Bank of America in 2004. In 2009, Mayopoulos was dismissed from his job as general counsel at Bank of America.

=== Fannie Mae ===
Mayopoulos joined Fannie Mae in 2009 as executive vice president, general counsel, and corporate secretary. In 2010, he became chief administrative officer for Fannie Mae. He was named president and chief executive officer of Fannie Mae in 2012. Mayopoulos worked to move Fannie Mae's long-time headquarters to the Midtown Center in Washington, D.C.

In July 2016, Fifth Third Bancorp, Ohio's largest bank, dismissed its general counsel Heather Russell, because she was having a romantic relationship with Mayopoulos, who was separated from his wife at the time. The company stated that it believed this represented a conflict of interest. Fannie Mae's Board of Directors and Fannie Mae's regulator and conservator, the Federal Housing Finance Agency, concluded that the relationship was not a conflict of interest. During his tenure at Fannie Mae, the company was profitable on an annual basis and delivered more than $167 billion in dividends to taxpayers.

In June 2018, Fannie Mae has announced that by the end of the year, CEO Timothy Mayopoulos would step down from his post. The company has said that Mayopoulos would remain in his position until he leaves the business. The board of Fannie Mae said that it would continue the hunt for its replacement.

=== After Fannie Mae ===
Mayopoulos became the president of Blend in 2019. The move was noteworthy as Mayopoulos was one of the first high-profile executives to join the financial technology industry. He also joined the company's board of directors.

Following the collapse of Silicon Valley Bank in March 2023, the Federal Deposit Insurance Corporation appointed Mayopoulos as CEO of the bank's successor, Silicon Valley Bridge Bank, N.A. Since 2017, Mayopoulos had been on a list of "seasoned financial services professionals" whom they could turn to in the event of a bank failure.

== Affiliations ==
He is a member of the board of directors of Science Applications International Corporation and is an independent director on Lending Club's Board of Directors. Mayopoulos has also been on the Board of Trustees of the Supreme Court Historical Society.

== Recognition ==
Mayopoulos was included amongst the first class of "Legends in Law" at the 2007 Burton Awards. In 2011, he was named one of the 500 most influential lawyers in the United States by Lawdragon. Mayopoulos received a Glassdoor Employees' Choice Award as a Highest Rated CEO in 2017.

== Personal life ==
Mayopoulos was married to Amy Lefkof, and they have two children. On November 21, 2020, Mayopoulos married Heather J. Russell in Bronxville, New York, and became stepfather to her two children.
