= Leerink Partners =

U.S. investment bank

Leerink Partners LLC
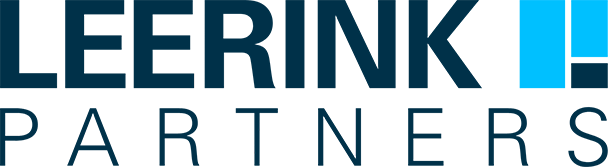

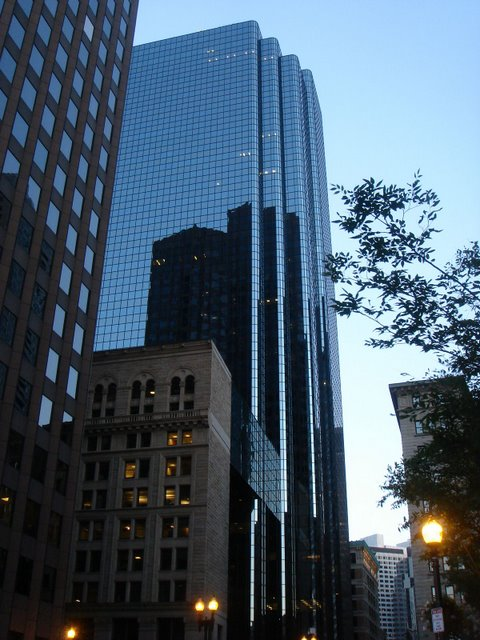
- Headquarters at Exchange Place
- Formerly: Leerink Swann (1995–2014); SVB Leerink (2019–2022); SVB Securities (2022–2023)
- Type: Private
- Industry: Financial services
- Founded: 1995; 31 years ago
- Founder: Jeffrey A. Leerink
- Headquarters: Exchange Place; Boston, Massachusetts, United States
- Products: Investment banking
- Parent: SVB Financial Group (2019–2023)
- Website: leerink.com

Leerink Partners LLC is an American independent investment bank providing healthcare companies and investors with financial services including M&A advisory, equity and debt capital markets, proprietary research, and sales and trading capabilities. The firm was founded in 1995 by Jeffrey A. Leerink, and is headquartered in Boston, Massachusetts, with U.S. offices in New York City; San Francisco, California; Charlotte, Miami, Los Angeles, Chicago and Nashville.

== History ==
Leerink Partners was founded in 1995 as Leerink Swann LLC. The following year, the bank established MEDACorp expert network as a joint venture with Dr. Dan Dubin. It acted as a strategic knowledge resource at Leerink, using validation of new products and commercial viability in the assessment of company financials, and corporate due diligence in the medial field as part of a merger and acquisition advisory or capital raising.

In 1999, Inc. named the bank as one of America's 500 fastest growing private companies.

In 2009, the firm expanded its investment banking footprint when 25 senior healthcare bankers joined the firm from Merrill Lynch.

The U.S. Securities and Exchange Commission (SEC) investigated a 2009 merger between Cougar Biotech and Johnson & Johnson in which Leerink advised Cougar.

In 2012, the SEC charged a former Leerink analyst for insider trading. The analyst had obtained confidential information about a merger transaction Leerink was working on and passed this information on to a friend to place trades on his behalf. The analyst gained around $600,000 from this investment and was later sentenced for insider trading.

In 2014, Leerink Swann was rebranded as Leerink Partners LLC and over the next few years established a specialty pharmaceuticals and services franchise (2015), a convertible capital markets business (2016), and established alternative equities and ATM businesses (2019).

In 2016, the firm co-founded the healthcare VC firm Transformation Capital and established Leerink Transformation Fund, a health IT growth equity fund, in 2017.

In 2021, SVB Leerink was rebranded as SVB Securities LLC. In 2021, the firm also expanded its leadership within the financial sponsor and leveraged finance sector and added five senior bankers to its healthcare services franchise.

Following the collapse of Silicon Valley Bank in March 2023, the management of SVB Securities planned to buy back their firm from the parent group. On March 17, 2023, SVB Securities' parent company filed for Chapter 11 bankruptcy, but SVB Securities itself was not included in the Chapter 11 filing.

In June 2023, SVB Financial Group agreed to sell SVB Securities in a management buyout led by the latter's CEO, Leerink. The deal, backed by funds managed by the Baupost Group, includes $55 million in cash besides repayment of $26 million in debt and assumption of other liabilities. In July 2023, the buyout was approved in bankruptcy court, and SVB Securities was renamed to Leerink Partners.

In the same year, Leerink Partners opened an office in Miami.

In 2025, Tom Davidson, founding partner of PJT Partners, joined Leerink Partners as co-president and co-head of global investment banking. The firm also announced plans to open a London office in 2025.

== Leerink Center for Pharmacoeconomics ==
Established in 2024, the center focuses on evaluating the long-term societal value of healthcare innovations, including pharmaceuticals and medical treatments. Using methodologies such as cost-effectiveness analysis (CEA) and generalized cost-effectiveness analysis (GCEA), the CPE assesses health outcomes, economic impact, productivity, and equity considerations. Led by Dr. Melanie Whittington, the center aims to inform healthcare decision-making by publishing research, commentaries, and analysis on the broader value of medical interventions beyond direct clinical benefits.
