= Gregory W. Becker =

American banking executive (born 1966/7)

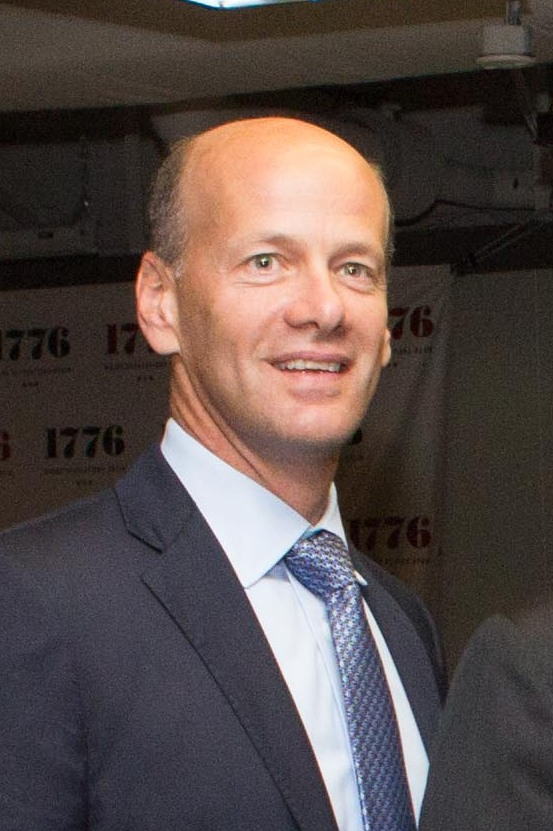
- Becker in 2015
- Born: 1966 or 1967 (age 59–60)
- Education: Indiana University (B.A.)
- Known for: Final CEO of Silicon Valley Bank (SVB) prior to its collapse in 2023

Gregory W. Becker (born 1966 or 1967) is an American business executive who was the chief executive officer of SVB Financial Group and its chief banking subsidiary Silicon Valley Bank (SVB) from 2011 to 2023. He also was a board member of the Federal Reserve Bank of San Francisco before SVB's collapse in 2023.

== Early life and education ==
Becker grew up on his family's 300-acre (120 ha) farm in Fort Wayne, Indiana. His father ran a business supply company. He received a bachelor's degree in finance from the Kelley School of Business at Indiana University.

== Career ==
Becker's first job out of college was at a Comerica branch in Detroit. Initially, the bank's records erroneously showed that he held a Master of Business Administration; he corrected the error, but it opened up opportunities for him. His manager offered him an opportunity to spend nine months working in the bank's branch in Pleasanton, California. Drawn by the weather, he stayed and worked at a small bank that Comerica had acquired in San Jose.

In 1993, Becker followed his manager to Silicon Valley Bank (SVB). One of his first deals as a loan officer there was to lend $350,000 to a company that would get acquired by Cisco for $100 million. In 1996, he opened the bank's branch in Boulder, Colorado.

In 1999, he returned to Silicon Valley to found SVB Capital, the group's venture capital fund management division. He rose through the ranks to become the bank's chief banking officer, chief operating officer, and, in 2008, its president. He was promoted to president of parent company SVB Financial Group in 2010, then became the chief executive officer of both companies on April 21, 2011.

=== Silicon Valley Bank failure ===
On February 27, 2023, Becker sold 12,451 shares of company stock, worth a total of $3.6 million. The sale was made through an executive trading plan filed with the U.S. Securities and Exchange Commission on January 26, 2023. Following news of SVB's dire financial circumstances on March 9, 2023, Becker urged venture capitalist firms to avoid panic in order to stave off a collapse.

Following news of SVB's failure on March 10, 2023, Becker was reportedly no longer on the board of the Federal Reserve Bank of San Francisco. In the aftermath of SVB's collapse, Becker received criticism from Senator Elizabeth Warren, Representative Ro Khanna of California, and Mayor Matt Mahan of San Jose, who called for money from the stock sale to be clawed back and given to depositors. Reports and photos show that immediately after the SVB collapse, Becker flew first class to his $3.1 million cottage in Hawaii, leaving his colleagues to deal with the failure. Becker stated during his Senate testimony that, "We decided we were going to go to one of two places to be with family. Either we would be with my family in Indiana or her family in Hawaii."

Following the failure of Silicon Valley Bank, Becker remained a board member and the CEO of Silicon Valley Financial Group, the former parent of Silicon Valley Bank, until April 19, 2023, when he resigned both roles.

== Affiliations ==
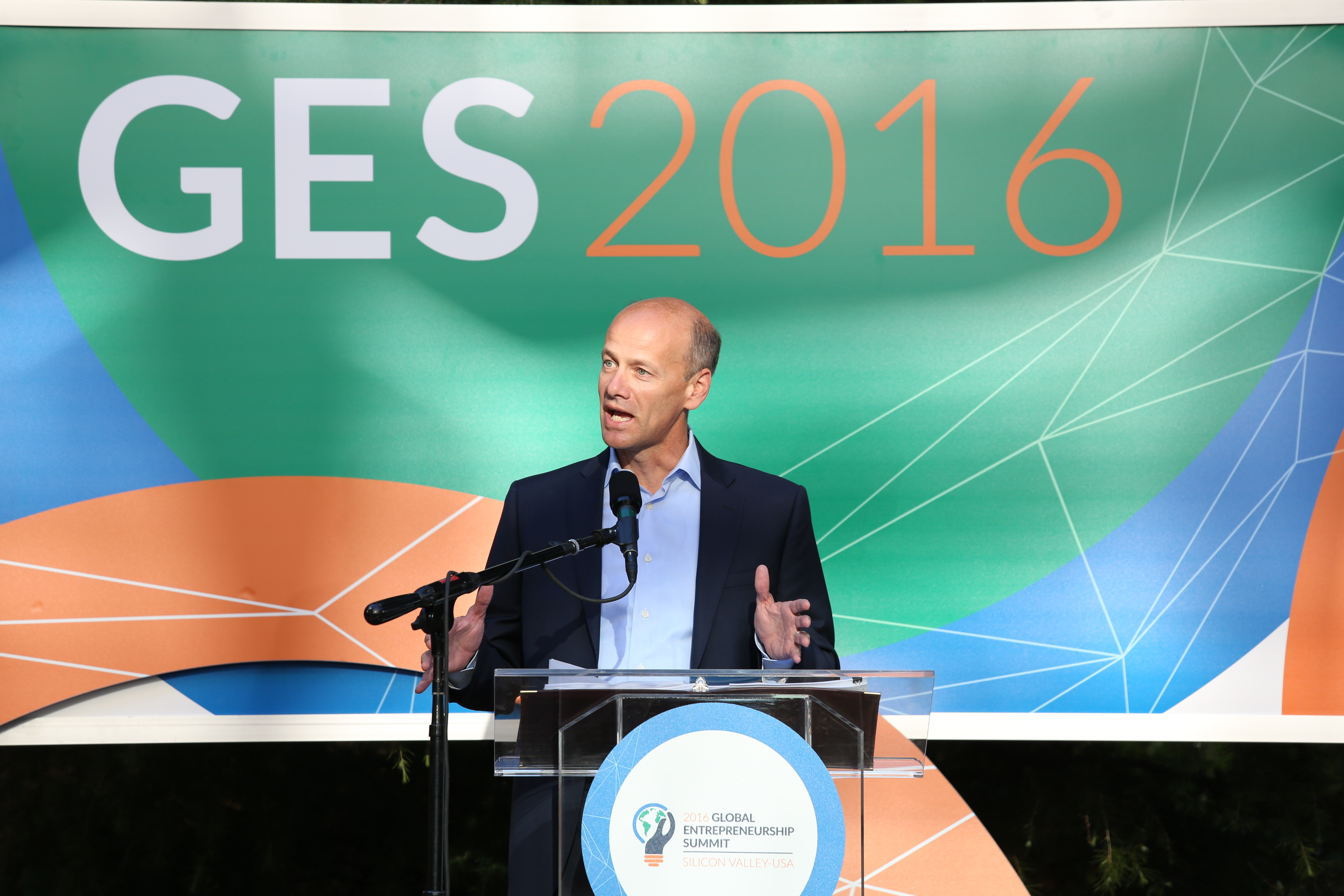
Becker delivered the opening remarks at the 2016 Global Entrepreneurship Summit.

Becker is on the West Coast Advisory Board of the Johnson Center for Entrepreneurship & Innovation at the Kelley School of Business and, since 2021, the Guiding Council of One Mind at Work, a group that advocates for workplace mental health.

Until the collapse of Silicon Valley Bank in March 2023, Becker represented the bank in several organizations, including trade groups that supported the bank's business agenda. He was a Class A Director of the Federal Reserve Bank of San Francisco from January 2019; the executive council of the TechNet trade association from 2016, including as chair from 2020 to 2022; and the Silicon Valley Leadership Group's executive board from 2011, including as chair from 2014 to 2017.

He was on the executive advisory board of the Alliance for Southern California Innovation from 2017 to 2018 and on the United States Department of Commerce's Digital Economy Board of Advisors from 2016 to 2017.

== Personal life ==
Becker is a competitive cyclist. In 2010, he raised $500,000 for Best Buddies on a 100-mile (160 km) ride in California.

In 2025 the San Francisco Standard reported the US Federal Government had filed a lawsuit against Silicon Valley Bank leaders over what it refers to as "gross negligence."
