= Waterfield Group =

US Financial services holding company

- Type: Private
- Industry: Financial services
- Founded: 1928
- Founder: Richard H. Waterfield
- Headquarters: Fort Wayne, Indiana, United States
- Area served: Worldwide
- Services: Investment banking Trading & principal investments Asset management

The Waterfield Group is a financial services holding company that was founded in 1928 by Richard H. Waterfield. J. Randall Waterfield, a former manager at Goldman Sachs and grandson of Richard H. Waterfield, serves as the Waterfield Group's chairman. As of 2000, the Waterfield Group was the largest privately held mortgage company in the US.

The Waterfield Group sold its mortgage company, Waterfield Mortgage, in December 2006 to Sky Financial Group. In 2010, the Office of Thrift Supervision closed Waterfield Bank, which was majority-owned by the Waterfield Group.
