= Bridge bank =

State regulated operator of a failed bank

A bridge bank is an institution created by a national regulator or central bank to operate a failed bank until a buyer can be found.

While national laws vary, the bridge bank is usually established by a publicly backed deposit insurance organisation or financial regulator and may be instituted to avoid systemic risk and provide an orderly transition avoiding negative effects such as bank runs.

Typically, the tasks of a bridge bank are to ensure seamless continuity of banking operations by:

- Assuming the deposits of and honouring the commitments of the failed bank, so that service to retail clients is not disrupted
- Servicing adequately secured existing loans to avoid their premature interruption or termination
- Assuming other existing assets, liabilities or functions of the defunct bank at the discretion of the regulator

These tasks are carried out on a temporary basis (usually for no more than two or three years) to provide time to find a buyer for the bank as a going concern. If the bank cannot be sold as a going concern, its portfolio of assets are liquidated in an orderly fashion. Should the bridge bank fail to wind down its operations within the allotted time, the national deposit insurance corporation is appointed as the receiver of the bridge bank's assets.

== Operation by country ==
=== Nigeria ===
In Nigeria the (Central Bank of Nigeria (CBN) and the Nigeria Deposit Insurance Corporation (NDIC) administer the deposits and liabilities of a failed bank. Under the arrangement, the NDIC is authorized to operate a failed bank for a period until a buyer can be found for its operations.

When in the opinion of CBN, a NDIC-insured bank is in financial trouble, the CBN and NDIC may establish a bridge bank to;

- Assume the deposits of the closed bank;
- Assume such other liabilities of the closed bank as the Deposit Insurance Corporation may determine to be appropriate;
- Purchase such assets of the closed bank as the Deposit Insurance Corporation may determine to be appropriate; and
- Perform any other temporary function which the Deposit Insurance Corporation may prescribe in accordance with this Act.

Bridge banks are authorized to seek to liquidate failed banks, either by finding buyers for the bank as a going concern, or by liquidating its portfolio of assets, within two years, which can be extended by an additional year. Should the bridge bank fail to wind down its operations within the allotted time, the bridge bank must notify the Governor of the CBN of its intent to dissolve the bridge bank. Under this situation, the NDIC is appointed as the receiver of the bridge bank's assets.

==== Historic example ====
On August 5, 2011, Central Bank of Nigeria revoked the operating licenses of three banks including; Afribank, Spring Bank, and Bank PHB, which according to it, did not show enough capacity and ability for recapitalization.

In their place, the CBN through the NDIC established Bridge Banks and transferred the assets and liabilities of the three affected banks to the Bridge Banks as follows;

1. Mainstreet Bank Limited (Afribank),
2. Keystone Bank Limited (Bank PHB), and
3. Enterprise Bank Limited (Spring Bank).

Under the arrangement, MainStreet Bank Limited took over the assets and liabilities of Afribank; Keystone Bank Limited assumed the assets and liabilities of Bank PHB, while Enterprise Bank Limited took over that of Spring Bank.

The Asset Management Corporation of Nigeria (AMCON) immediately acquired from the Nigeria Deposit Insurance Corporation (NDIC), the three Bridge Banks. Accordingly, AMCON injected N679 billion into the Bridge Banks to meet the minimum capital base of N25 billion and the minimum capital adequacy ratio of 15 per cent.

=== United States ===
In the United States law of banking regulation, a bridge bank is organized by federal bank regulators to administer the deposits and liabilities of a failed bank. Under the Competitive Equality Banking Act (CEBA) of 1987, the Federal Deposit Insurance Corporation (FDIC) is authorized to operate a failed bank for a period of up to three years, until a buyer can be found for its operations.

Under CEBA, when a FDIC-insured bank is in financial trouble, the FDIC "may establish a bridge bank to —

1. assume the deposits of the closed bank;
2. assume such other liabilities of the closed bank as the Corporation, in the Corporation's discretion, may determine to be appropriate;
3. purchase such assets of the closed bank as the Corporation, in the Corporation's discretion, may determine to be appropriate; and
4. perform any other temporary function which the Corporation may prescribe in accordance with this Act."

Bridge banks must be chartered as national banks in accordance with US banking law. To the extent possible, bridge banks are required to honor the commitments of the failed bank to its customers, and not to interrupt or terminate adequately secured loans. Bridge banks are authorized to seek to liquidate failed banks, either by finding buyers for the bank as a going concern, or by liquidating its portfolio of assets, within two years, which can be extended for cause by an additional year. Should the bridge bank fail to wind down its operations within the allotted time, the bridge bank must notify the Comptroller of the Currency of its intent to dissolve the bridge bank. Under this situation, the FDIC is appointed as the receiver of the bridge bank's assets.

A deposit insurance national bank (DINB) is a related kind of institution that is strictly limited to management of insured deposits.

== See also ==
- Bad bank
- Financial services in Japan § Financial institutions
- Government intervention during the subprime mortgage crisis and List of banks acquired or bankrupted during the Great Recession
- Korea Deposit Insurance Corporation § Resolution of Failed Financial Institutions
- List of banks acquired or bankrupted in the United States during the 2008 financial crisis
- Receivership
- Zombie bank
