= Silicon Valley Leadership Group =

Advocacy group in Silicon Valley, California

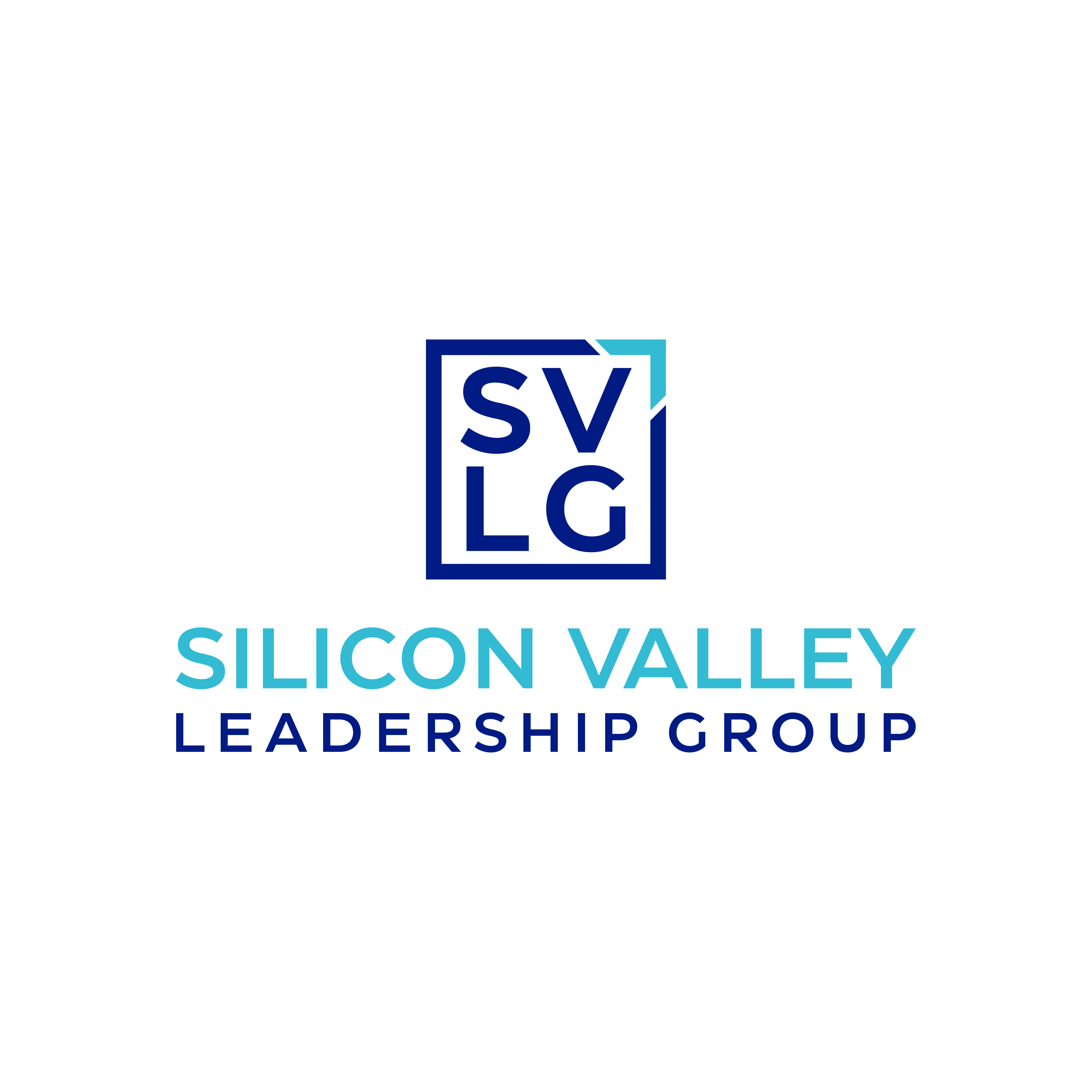
- Founded: 1978
- Founder: David Packard
- Type: Advocacy group
- Purpose: Technology business advocacy
- Location: 2001 Gateway Place, Suite 101E, San Jose, California
- Region served: Silicon Valley
- Key people: Ahmad Thomas, President & CEO; Jed York, Board Chairman
- Website: www.svlg.org

The Silicon Valley Leadership Group (abbreviated SVLG) is an American non-profit advocacy group in Silicon Valley, California. Its members are businesses that operate in the valley and its purpose is to influence public policy relating to the valley.

The organization was founded in 1978 by David Packard, co-founder of Hewlett-Packard, and represents more than 390 Silicon Valley's firms.

== History ==
The group was founded as the Santa Clara County Manufacturers Group (SCCMG) by David Packard in 1978, later becoming the Silicon Valley Manufacturing Group. Like the Bay Area Council, it focused on regional politics. In the 1980s, it became the dominant business advocacy group in the Silicon Valley region, eclipsing chambers of commerce such as the San Jose Chamber of Commerce. By 1982, it counted 85 of the region's largest employers as members. In March 2005, it changed its name to Silicon Valley Leadership Group. Carl Guardino served as CEO from January 1997 through July 2020. On July 23, 2020, Ahmad Thomas was named the new CEO effective August 10, 2020.

== Issues ==
=== San Francisco Bay Area tax measures ===
The Silicon Valley Leadership Group was a key supporter of Regional Measure 3, a $3 per-trip toll increase per vehicle to cross San Francisco Bay Area bridges, approved in June 2018 by 55 percent of Bay Area voters. SVLG is now a key partner along with the Bay Area Council and SPUR in proposing a $100 billion "mega tax" for November 2020 ballots, to pay for high-cost highway and transit projects paid for over 40 years by a one-percent sales tax increase in all nine Bay Area counties. Like RM3, the mega tax, called "Faster Bay Area" by proponents, would require state legislation to authorize the multi-county ballot tax measure. SVLG also supports another multi-county Bay Area 2020 tax increase, a 1/4-percent sales tax for further improvements to Caltrain service, which would apply in San Francisco, San Mateo, and Santa Clara counties.

=== Santa Clara sales tax measures ===
The SVLG has been heavily involved with a number of sales tax increase measures in Santa Clara County; specifically 1996, 2000, and the failed June 2006 measure. In June 2006, SVLG and the South Bay Labor Council outspent their opponents $1.2 million to $50,000 in an effort to raise the county sales tax further. In spite of this huge discrepancy SVLG lost.

At the same time SVLG was campaigning for increasing the local sales tax, they were en route to Sacramento on a lobbying junket to push for two bills - SB 1291 and AB 2218 - that would have exempt companies from state sales taxes for purchasing equipment used in manufacturing and research.

=== Immigration reform ===
SVLG advocates immigration reform in the United States, claiming there is a growing lack of skilled labor in Silicon Valley that could be closed by immigration. Specifically, the SVLG advocates increasing the number of H-1B visas and easing access to green cards.

=== U.S. Patents and Trademarks Office ===
SVLG has supported San Jose in its bid for a regional patent office. In 2012, the group claimed the confirmation of San Jose as a host of one of the four regional offices a "big win".

=== Electrification of Caltrain ===
The Silicon Valley Leadership Group has worked in coordination with local leaders to fund the electrification of Caltrain. In May 2017, the Federal Transit Administration approved a $647 million grant for the project. SVLG CEO Carl Guardino described the confirmation of the federal grant as "the major holidays wrapped into one with a beautiful Caltrain bow around it.” In July 2017, a group including Guardino, Caltrain's CEO, elected officials and business leaders celebrated the official groundbreaking of the Caltrain project.

=== Local philanthropy ===
Starting in 2004, the Group has sponsored an annual charity "Turkey Trot" run, with the proceeds going to local charities. The annual target is $1 million of contributions.
