= 2023 United States banking crisis =

Banking crisis beginning in March 2023

The 2023 United States banking crisis was a series of bank failures and bankruptcies that took place in early 2023, with the United States federal government ultimately intervening in several ways. Over the course of five days in March 2023, three small-to-mid size U.S. banks failed, triggering a sharp decline in global bank stock prices and swift response by regulators to prevent potential global contagion. Silicon Valley Bank (SVB) failed when a bank run was triggered after it sold its Treasury bond portfolio at a large loss, causing depositor concerns about the bank's liquidity. The bonds had lost significant value as market interest rates rose after the bank had shifted its portfolio to longer-maturity bonds. The bank's clientele was primarily technology companies and wealthy individuals holding large deposits, but balances exceeding $250,000 were not insured by the Federal Deposit Insurance Corporation (FDIC). Silvergate Bank and Signature Bank, both with significant exposure to cryptocurrency, failed in the midst of turbulence in that market, especially following major losses during the bankruptcy of FTX.

In response to the bank failures, the three major U.S. federal bank regulators announced in a joint communiqué that extraordinary measures would be taken to ensure that all deposits at Silicon Valley Bank and Signature Bank would be honored. The Federal Reserve established a Bank Term Funding Program (BTFP) to offer loans of up to one year to eligible depository institutions pledging qualifying assets as collateral.

To prevent the situation from affecting more banks, global industry regulators, including the Federal Reserve, the Bank of Canada, Bank of England, Bank of Japan, European Central Bank, and Swiss National Bank intervened to provide extraordinary liquidity.

By March 16, large interbank flows of funds were occurring to shore up bank balance sheets and some analysts were talking of a possibly broader U.S. banking crisis. The Federal Reserve discount window liquidity facility had experienced approximately $150 billion in borrowing from various banks by March 16.

Soon after the bank run at SVB, depositors quickly began withdrawing cash from San Francisco-based First Republic Bank (FRB), which focused on private banking to wealthy clientele. Like SVB, FRB had substantial uninsured deposits exceeding $250,000; such deposits constituted 68% of the bank's total at year-end 2022, declining to 27% by the end of March, as $100 billion in uninsured deposits were withdrawn. Despite a $30 billion capital infusion from a group of major banks in March, FRB continued to destabilize and its stock price plummeted as the FDIC prepared to take it into receivership and find a buyer on April 29. On May 1, the FDIC announced that First Republic had been closed and sold to JPMorgan Chase.

== Background ==
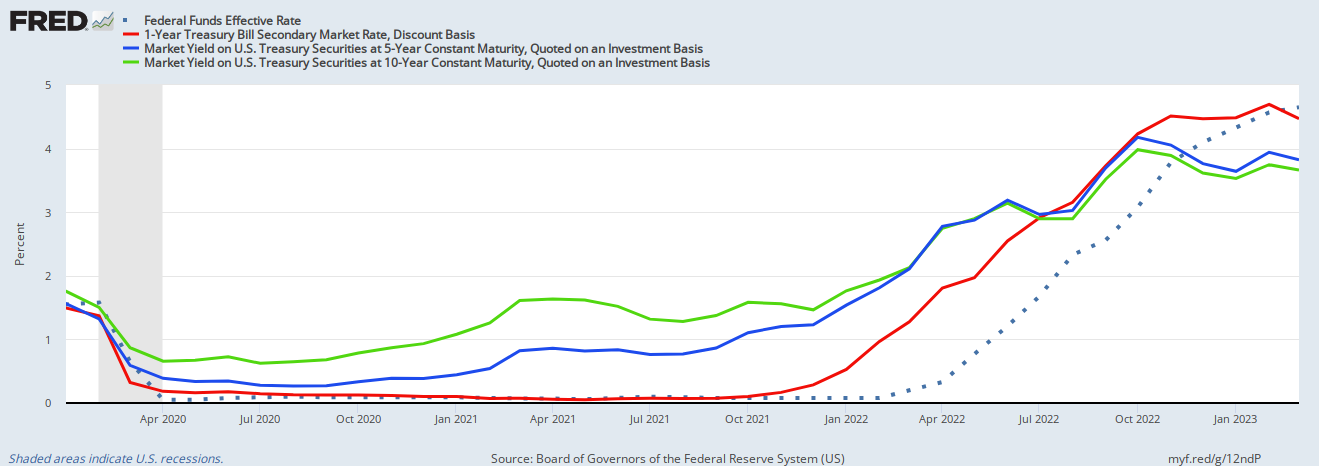
Normal yield curve began inverting in July 2022, causing short-term Treasury rates to exceed long-term rates

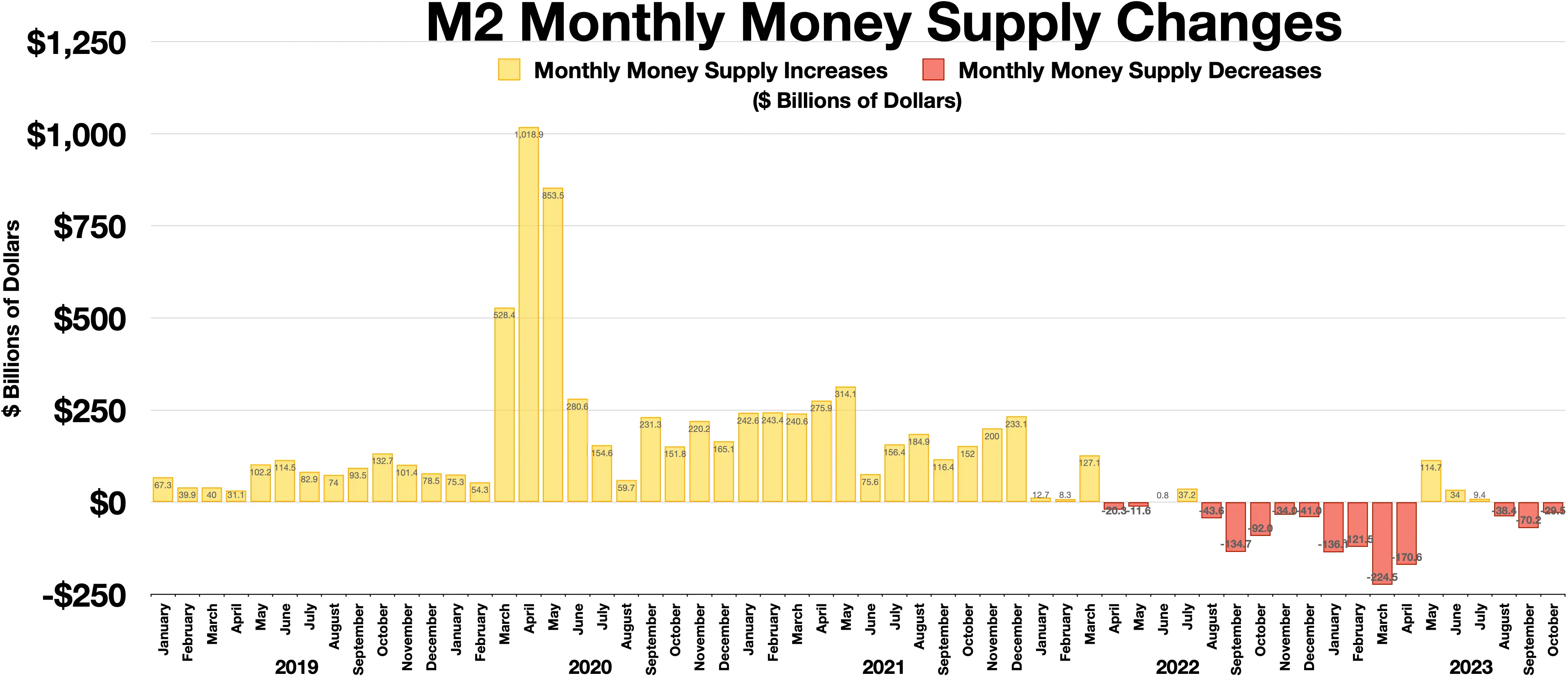
M2 monthly money supply changes. Money supply dropped by $-224.5 billion in March 2023. The largest drop on record since 1959.

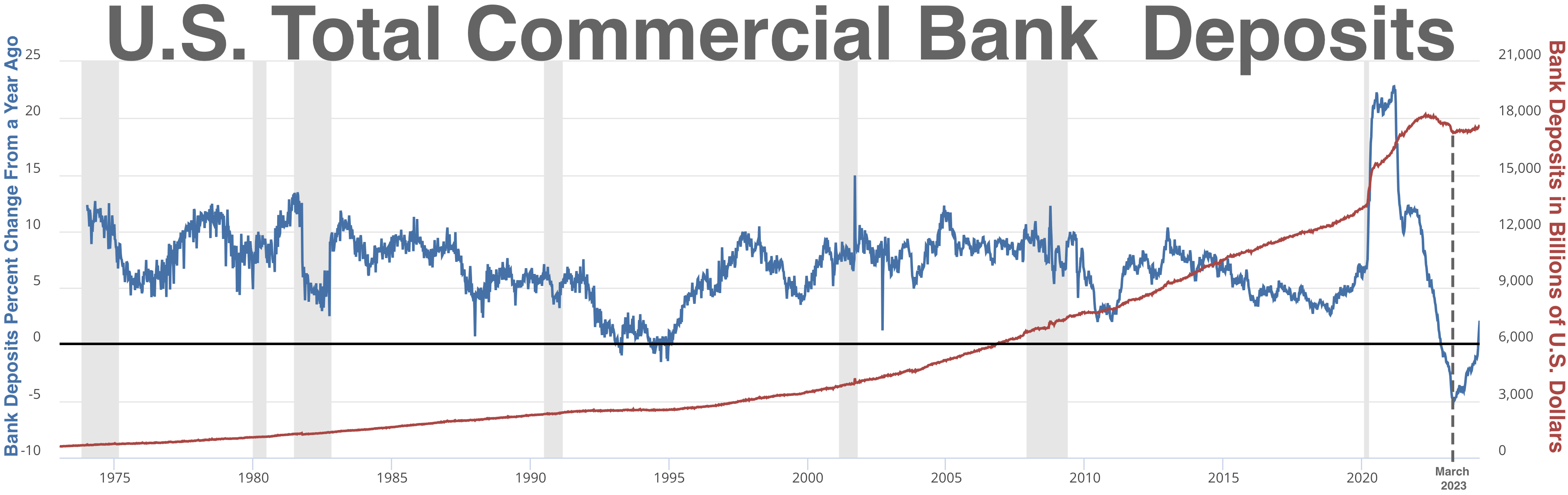
March 2023 banking crisis bank deposits Bank deposits percent change Y/Y Bank deposits in billions of U.S. Dollars

=== COVID-19 pandemic and federal stimulus ===
In financial markets, primary dealers purchase government securities (such as U.S. Treasury Securities) directly from the U.S. Treasury during regular auctions to ensure the national debt is funded, while secondary dealers and commercial banks trade these existing assets on the secondary open market. By doing so, primary dealers secure a privileged gatekeeping position that allows them to serve as the sole counterparties for the Federal Reserve's monetary policy operations and profit from the bid-ask spreads inherent in maintaining secondary market liquidity. Examples of primary dealers include JPMorgan Chase, Goldman Sachs, Wells Fargo, and Citigroup. Examples of secondary dealers include regional banks, specialized hedge funds, and at one point, Silicon Valley Bank (SVB).

During the early years of the COVID-19 pandemic between 2020 and 2021, as customers shifted to digital services, tech startups saw record fundraising levels. As a result, commercial banks serving tech clients such as SVB saw total deposits grow from $62 billion in March 2020 to $189 billion by the end of 2021.

At the same time, following massive stimulus into the U.S. economy by the federal government and the Federal Reserve at the start of the pandemic, corporate and consumer demand for traditional commercial loans decreased significantly as tech firms were flush with venture capital and pandemic stimulus-related liquidity, and therefore had little need for conventional debt. Consequently, banks were forced to find alternative vehicles for their idle cash to generate a profit (a core institutional function) leading them to park these massive reserves into the bond market. They favored long-dated U.S. Treasury Securities and mortgage-backed securities (MBS) because these offered slightly higher yields than short-term investments and were perceived as "risk-free" at the time.

=== Interest rate risk and bond market devaluation ===
However, the yields on early pandemic U.S. Treasuries had been driven to near-zero levels as the Federal Reserve suppressed interest rates (via quantitative easing; rapidly repurchasing U.S. Treasuries from primary dealers on the secondary market and flooding those sellers with instant cash reserves) to stabilize the financial market following the 2020 pandemic lockdowns. The reason yields went down is because when the Fed creates an artificial surge in demand by aggressively bidding up the price of existing bonds, the fixed interest payments on those bonds represent a smaller and smaller percentage of the increased purchase price, thereby mathematically compressing the yield toward zero. For example, if one pays $1,000 for a bond that pays $20 a year, the yield is 2%. But, if the Fed starts a bidding war and drives the price of that same bond up to $2,000, that $20 payment now only represents a 1% yield. The payment didn't change; the entry price did. By overpaying for bonds, the Fed effectively forced the "interest rate" of the entire market to collapse.

Thereafter, these low rates incentivized aggressive speculation and record-breaking capital infusions into the tech sector throughout the pandemic, which significantly inflated bank deposit bases. However, the subsequent Federal Reserve interest rate hikes in 2022, enacted to combat the 2021-2023 inflation surge, caused bond prices to decline sharply. This is so because of a concept called bond convexity, where when interest rates rise from the fed funds rate, new bonds are issued with higher coupon payments (due to market forces against the U.S. Treasury to issue higher yields as a hedge against the fear of inflation), which makes existing bonds with lower rates appear unattractive. Therefore, to entice a reasonable investor to purchase these older, lower-yielding bonds, their market price must drop until their total return (consisting of the original low interest plus the discount on the purchase price) aligns with the newer, higher market rates.

This scenario is precisely what happened to SVB. Consequently, this collapse in market value eroded bank capital reserves and forced Silicon Valley Bank to sell its devalued assets in the secondary market to maintain liquidity, realizing the steep losses that ultimately triggered its collapse.

=== Venture capital and cryptocurrency volatility ===
In addition, several banks gained market exposure to cryptocurrency and cryptocurrency-related firms prior to and during the COVID-19 pandemic; the 2020–2022 cryptocurrency bubble popped in late 2022. In this environment, three such banks failed or were shut down by regulators: The first bank to fail, cryptocurrency-focused Silvergate Bank, announced it would wind down on March 8, 2023, due to losses suffered in its loan portfolio. Two days later, upon announcement of an attempt to raise capital, a bank run occurred at Silicon Valley Bank, causing it to collapse and be seized by regulators that day. Signature Bank, a bank that frequently did business with cryptocurrency firms, was closed by regulators two days later on March 12, with regulators citing systemic risks. The collapses of First Republic Bank, Silicon Valley Bank and Signature Bank were the second-, third- and fourth-largest bank failures in the history of the United States, respectively, smaller only than the collapse of Washington Mutual during the 2008 financial crisis.

In 2019, the Federal Reserve's "Tailoring rules" changed, increasing minimum asset threshold from $50 billion to $100 billion and reduced the number of required stress testing scenarios, allowing banks with under $100 billion to have reduced liquidity standards. Signature Bank and First Republic Bank were under the $100 billion total assets for the Federal Reserve's tailoring rules, allowing the banks to have reduced regulation for liquidity. Some have questioned if First Republic Bank would have had a bank run if there were similar regulation to EU countries in the United States.

== Liquidation of Silvergate Bank ==
=== Background ===
Silvergate Bank was a California-based bank that began operations in 1988 as a savings and loan association. In the 2010s, the bank began to provide banking services to players within the cryptocurrency market. The bank sought regulatory approval in the summer of 2014 to do business with cryptocurrency firms. The bank expanded the assets on its balance sheet significantly—doubling its assets in its 2017 fiscal year to $1.9 billion—by servicing cryptocurrency exchanges and other companies who were involved in the cryptocurrency business that could not secure financing from larger, more conservative banks. Despite its rapid growth, the company maintained a small physical footprint; in 2018, the bank had only three branches, all located in Southern California. By the fourth quarter of 2022, 90% of the bank's deposits had become cryptocurrency-related, with over $1 billion in deposits being tied to Sam Bankman-Fried.

In addition to providing traditional banking services to its cryptocurrency clients, the bank operated as a clearinghouse for its banking clients; it involved itself in the business of resolving and settling transactions in real-time through its proprietary Silvergate Exchange Network. The network allowed a client to send payments in U.S. dollars from its accounts with Silvergate to those of another client of the bank without requiring an interbank wire transfer. A large number of cryptocurrency companies set up accounts with the bank to take advantage of Silvergate's relatively quick transaction settling times.

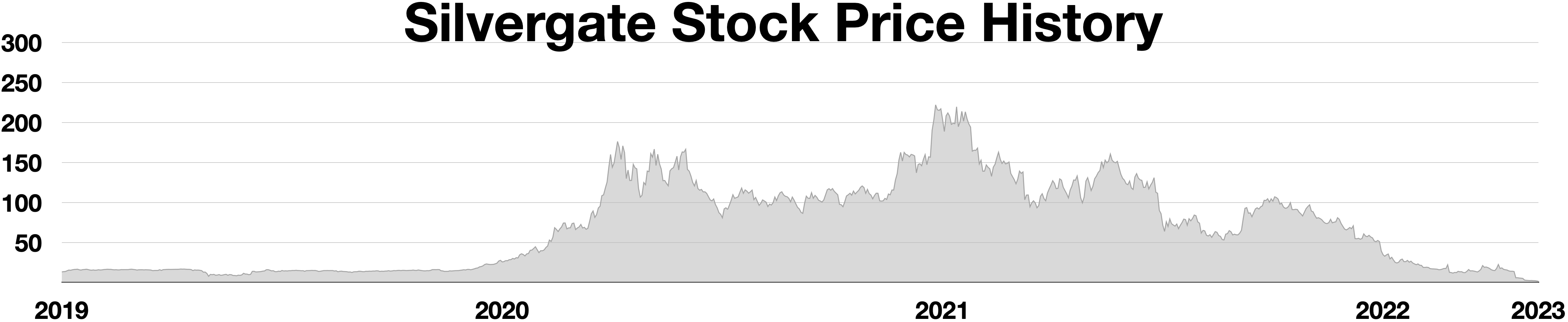
Silvergate stock price (2019–2023)

Despite conducting the majority of its business with cryptocurrency companies, Silvergate's investment portfolio was fairly conservative; the company took large positions in mortgage-backed securities as well as U.S. bonds. These sorts of assets, while reliable to be paid-in-full through their maturity date, carry risks associated with changes in interest rates; there is an inverse relationship between the mark-to-market value of a bond and the bond's yield. As interest rates shot up during the 2021–2023 inflation surge, the mark-to-market price of these securities decreased significantly. When these losses are unrealized, this does not typically cause the bank to cease operating, as the bank will receive payment-in-full under the original terms of the bond. However, if forced to sell these securities at a lower mark-to-market price, the losses on these types of assets become realized, posing significant risks to the bank's ability to continue to operate.

=== Events ===
Silvergate was hit with a bank run in the wake of the bankruptcy of FTX; deposits from cryptocurrency-related firms dropped by 68% at the bank, with the bank facing requests from its clients to withdraw upwards of $8 billion in deposits. As Silvergate did not have enough cash-on-hand to satisfy the deposit withdrawals, the bank began to sell its assets at a steep loss; the company realized a loss of $718 million on withdrawal-related asset sales in the fourth fiscal quarter of 2022 alone. The bank, in a public statement, said that it was solvent at the end of Q4 2022, with an asset sheet containing assets of $4.6 billion in cash and $5.6 billion in liquid debt securities, with $3.8 billion in deposit obligations. Silvergate faced tight financial constraints in the coming months, selling assets at a loss and borrowing $3.6 billion from the Federal Home Loan Bank of San Francisco to maintain its liquidity. Silvergate wrote in a regulatory filing on March 1 that the bank risked losing its status as a well-capitalized bank and that the bank faced risks relating to its ability to continue operating.

Facing continued losses from sales of securities at mark-to-market price, Silvergate released a public notice on March 8, 2023, saying that it would undergo voluntary liquidation and would return all deposited funds to their respective owners.

== Collapse of Silicon Valley Bank ==
=== Background ===
Silicon Valley Bank (SVB) was a commercial bank founded in 1983 and headquartered in Santa Clara, California. Until its collapse, SVB was the 16th largest bank in the United States and was heavily skewed toward serving companies and individuals from the technology industry. Nearly half of U.S. venture capital-backed healthcare and technology companies were financed by SVB. Companies such as Airbnb, Cisco, Fitbit, Pinterest, and Block, Inc. have been clients of the bank. In addition to financing venture-backed companies, SVB was well known as a source of private banking, personal credit lines, and mortgages to tech entrepreneurs. According to the FDIC, it had $209 billion in assets at the end of 2022.

Silicon Valley Bank recorded an increase of its deposit holdings during the COVID-19 pandemic, when the tech sector experienced a period of growth. In 2021, it purchased long-term Treasury bonds to capitalize on the increased deposits. However, the current market value of these bonds decreased as the Federal Reserve raised interest rates to curb the 2021–2023 inflation surge. Higher interest rates also raised borrowing costs throughout the economy and some Silicon Valley Bank clients started pulling money out to meet their liquidity needs.

=== Events ===
To raise cash to pay withdrawals by its depositors, SVB announced on March 8 that it had sold over US$21 billion worth of securities, borrowed US$15 billion, and would hold an emergency sale of some of its treasury stock to raise US$2.25 billion. The announcement, coupled with warnings from prominent Silicon Valley investors, caused a bank run as customers withdrew funds totaling US$42 billion by the following day.

On March 10, 2023, as a result of the bank run, the California Department of Financial Protection and Innovation (DFPI) seized SVB and placed it under the receivership of the FDIC. The FDIC established a deposit insurance national bank, the Deposit Insurance National Bank of Santa Clara, to service insured deposits and announced that it would start paying dividends for uninsured deposits the following week; the dividends were funded by proceeds from the sale of SVB assets. Some 89 percent of the bank's US$172 billion in deposit liabilities exceeded the maximum insured by the FDIC. Two days after the failure, the FDIC received exceptional authority from the Treasury and announced jointly with other agencies that all depositors would have full access to their funds the next morning. An initial auction of Silicon Valley Bank assets on the same day attracted a single bid, after PNC Financial Services and RBC Bank backed away from making offers. The FDIC rejected this offer and planned to hold a second auction to attract bids from major banks, now that the bank's systemic risk designation allowed the FDIC to insure all deposits. The bank was later reopened as a newly organized bridge bank, Silicon Valley Bridge Bank, N.A.

On March 26, 2023, the FDIC announced that First Citizens BancShares would acquire the commercial banking business of SVB. As part of the deal, First Citizens brought around $56.5 billion in deposits and $72 billion of SVB's loans discounted by $16.5 billion, while around $90 billion of SVB's securities continue to remain in receivership. The FDIC received about $500 million-worth of equity appreciation rights linked to First Citizens' shares. SVB's 17 branches reopened under the First Citizens brand the next day, with all SVB depositors becoming depositors of First Citizens. SVB Private was initially going to be auctioned separately but First Citizens later acquired the business as well. The UK arm of SVB was acquired by HSBC, which announced it would rename the business to HSBC Innovation Banking.

== Collapse of Signature Bank ==
=== Background ===
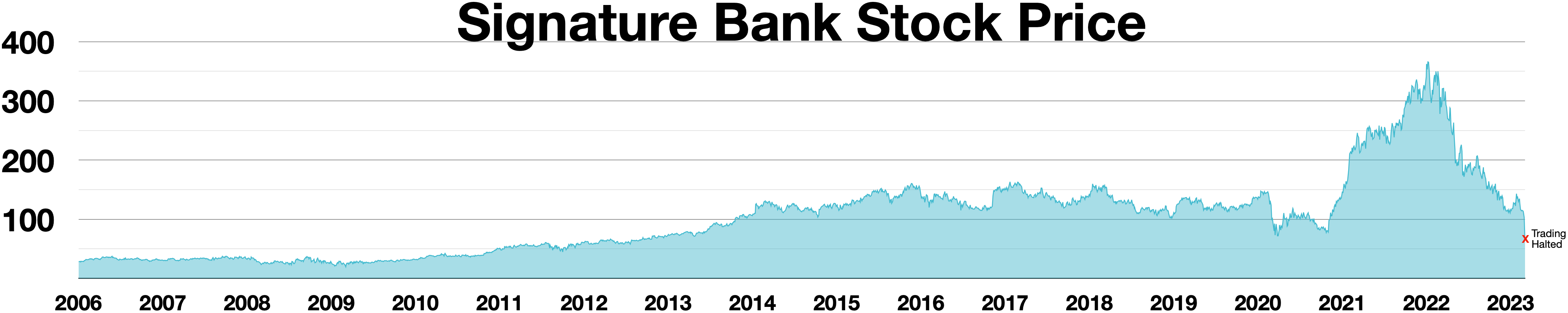
Signature Bank stock price (2006–2023)

Signature Bank was a New York City-based bank founded in 2001. The bank began as a subsidiary of Bank Hapoalim that took on clients with assets of around $250,000, lending to small businesses based in New York City and in the surrounding metropolitan area. The bank provided financing within the multifamily residential rental housing market in the New York metropolitan area beginning in 2007, though it began to reduce its exposure to the market during the 2010s. By 2019, just over four-tenths of the value of the bank's loans were made to multifamily homeowners in the New York metropolitan area, comprising $15.8 billion of the bank's then-$38.9 billion in net loans.

Beginning in 2018, Signature Bank began to court customers in the cryptocurrency industry, securing hires that were experienced in the area with the goal of moving away from its dependence on real estate lending. The quantity of deposits held at the bank expanded significantly, with deposits increasing from about $36.3 billion at the end of the 2018 fiscal year to $104 billion by August 2022; that month, over one-quarter of the bank's deposits held were those of cryptocurrency companies. Its cryptocurrency-sector clients included large cryptocurrency exchange operators, such as Celsius Network and Binance. By early 2023, Signature Bank had become the second largest provider of banking services to the cryptocurrency industry—second only to Silvergate Bank.

In addition to providing traditional banking services to cryptocurrency clients, Signature Bank opened a proprietary payment network for use among its cryptocurrency clients. The payment network, Signet, had opened in 2019 for approved clients, and allowed the real-time gross settlement of fund transfers through the blockchain without third parties or transaction fees. By the conclusion of 2020, Signature Bank had 740 clients using Signet. The network continued to expand during the following years; both Coinbase and the TrueUSD dollar-pegged stablecoin had become integrated with Signet in 2022 and 2021, respectively.

=== Events ===
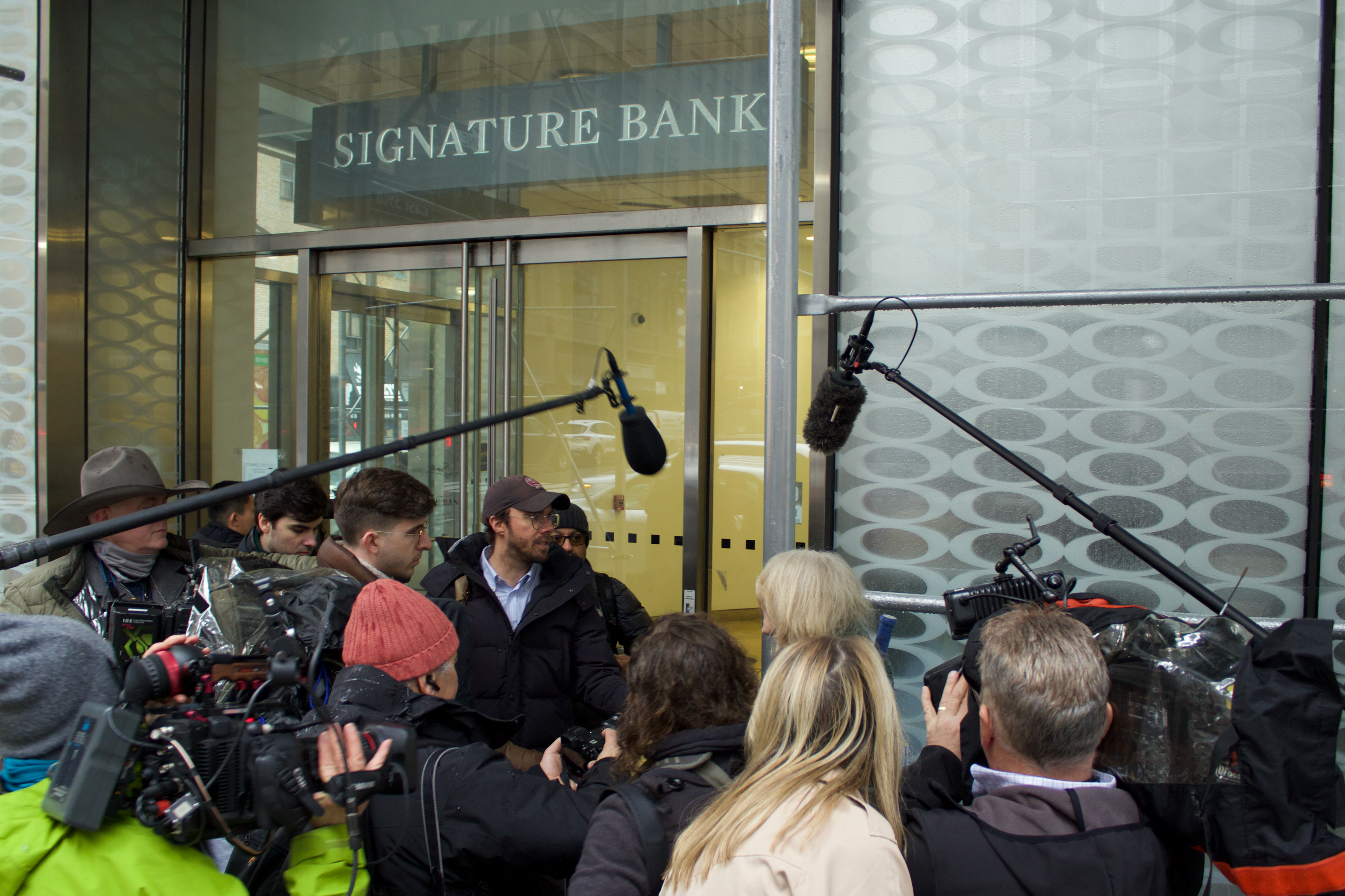
Reporters ask questions to Signature Bank customers exiting a New York location.

As cryptocurrency prices dropped significantly in 2022, particularly so after the collapse of cryptocurrency exchange FTX, depositors in Signature Bank began to withdraw deposits in the tune of billions of dollars; by the end of 2022, deposits in the bank totaled around $88.6 billion, down from $106.1 billion in deposits held at the beginning of the year—a time when over one-quarter of deposits were held by digital asset-related entities. Towards the end of 2022, Signature Bank cut business ties with cryptocurrency exchange Binance, seeking to reduce the bank's exposure to risk associated with the cryptocurrency market. According to Signature Bank board member Barney Frank, Signature Bank was hit with a multi-billion dollar bank run on Friday, March 10, with depositors expressing concern about cryptocurrency-related risks affecting the bank. Investor confidence in the bank was also badly shaken, and the bank's stock declined by 23% on that Friday—the day on which Silicon Valley bank collapsed—marking the then-largest single-day decline of the Signature Bank's value in its 22-year history.

On March 12, 2023, two days after the collapse of Silicon Valley Bank, Signature Bank was closed by regulators from the New York State Department of Financial Services in what is the third-biggest banking collapse in U.S. history. The bank proved unable to close a sale or otherwise bolster its finances before markets opened on Monday morning in order to protect its assets after customers began withdrawing their deposits in favor of bigger institutions, and shareholders of the bank lost all invested funds. The bank was placed under receivership by the FDIC, which immediately established Signature Bridge Bank, N.A. to operate its marketed assets to bidders.

Signature Bank had been under multiple federal investigations, ongoing at the time of the bank's collapse, regarding the rigor of its anti–money laundering measures. The U.S. Department of Justice had opened a criminal probe into whether the firm was performing due diligence when opening up new accounts and whether it was doing enough to detect and report potential criminal activity by its clients. The U.S. Securities and Exchange Commission had opened a separate, related civil probe.

On March 19, the New York Community Bank (NYCB) agreed to purchase around $38.4 billion in Signature's assets for $2.7 billion. Due to the deal, 40 Signature branches were rebranded to Flagstar Bank, one of NYCB's subsidiaries.

== Collapse of First Republic Bank ==
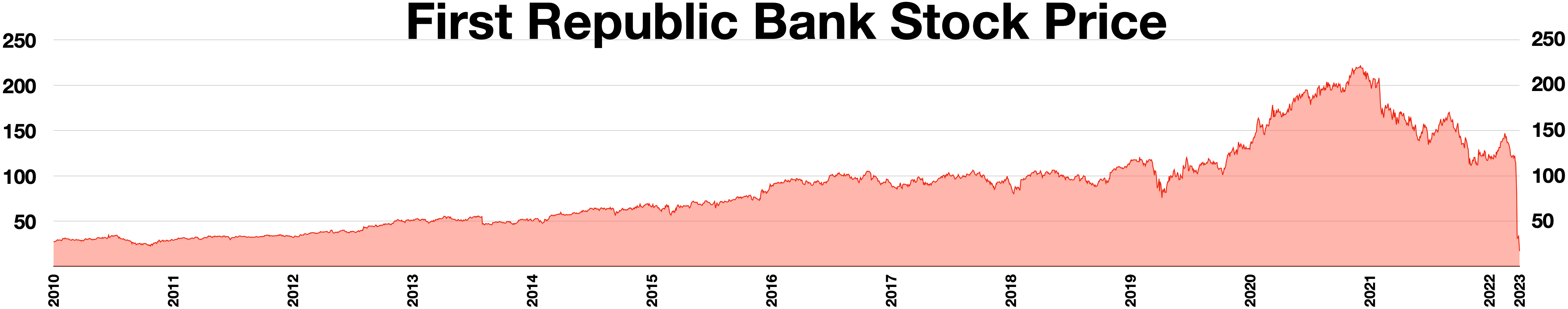
First Republic Bank stock price

=== Background ===
First Republic Bank (FRB) was based in San Francisco as a commercial bank and provider of wealth management services. It catered to high-net-worth individuals and operated 93 offices in 11 states, primarily in New York, California, Massachusetts, and Florida. It was the 14th largest U.S. bank at the end of 2022.

=== Events ===
Intense scrutiny and pressure were applied to other U.S. banks, including FRB. On March 13, its shares fell by 62%. As the bank faced significant liquidity issues, on March 16, it received a $30 billion lifeline in the form of deposits from a number of major U.S. banks, on top of a $70 billion financing facility provided by JPMorgan Chase & Co. Eleven of the largest U.S. banks participated in the rescue effort, under the direction of Jamie Dimon.

On March 19, S&P Global downgraded the credit rating of First Republic Bank further into junk by three notches saying that the private-sector rescue effort "may not solve the substantial business, liquidity, funding, and profitability challenges that we believe the bank is now likely facing." In its quarterly report in April, the bank said that deposits had plunged by more than $100 billion. The announcement caused the bank's share price to fall by more than 20%.

On April 28, the bank announced plans to begin selling its bonds and securities at a loss to raise equity and also begin laying off people. Multiple advisor teams began to leave the bank as well. On that day, it was announced that the FDIC was considering seizing the bank, causing its stock price to plunge another 43% to $3.50. After falling another 42% in after hours trading, the FDIC confirmed its imminent takeover of the bank. In 2023, the cumulative decrease in stock price was 97%. The next day, the FDIC approached various banks, including JPMorgan Chase, PNC and Bank of America, saying they had until April 30 to place bids for First Republic Bank.

On the morning of May 1, the California Department of Financial Protection and Innovation announced that FRB had been closed, and its assets were sold to JPMorgan for $10.6 billion.

== Aftermath ==
=== Bank Term Funding Program ===
In response to the bank failures of March, the government took extraordinary measures to mitigate fallout across the banking sector. On March 12, Federal Reserve created the Bank Term Funding Program (BTFP), an emergency lending program providing loans of up to one year in length to banks, savings associations, credit unions, and other eligible depository institutions. The program was designed to provide liquidity to financial institutions following the collapse of Silicon Valley Bank and other bank failures, and to reduce the risks associated with current unrealized losses in the U.S. banking system that totaled over $600 billion at the time of the program's launch. Funded through the Deposit Insurance Fund, the program offered loans of up to one year to eligible borrowers who pledged as collateral certain types of securities including U.S. Treasuries, agency debt, and mortgage-backed securities. The collateral was valued at par instead of open-market value, so a bank could borrow on asset values that have not been impaired by a series of interest rate hikes since 2022. The Federal Reserve also eased conditions at its discount window. The Department of the Treasury said it would make available up to $25 billion from its Exchange Stabilization Fund as a backstop for the program. In January 2024, the Federal Reserve raised the interest rate on new BTFP loans, stating loans outstanding in the program as of January 17 were $161.5 billion. The program ceased offering new loans on March 11, 2024.

=== Government discussion of other funding ===
In addition to working with their counterparts at the FDIC and U.S. Treasury to provide liquidity to banks through the BTFP, by March 2023, the Federal Reserve had begun to internally discuss implementing stricter capital reserve and liquidity requirements for banks with between $100 billion and $250 billion in assets on their balance sheets. A review of regulations affecting regional banks had been ongoing since 2022, as Federal Reserve vice chairman Michael Barr and other officials in the Biden Administration had become increasingly concerned about the risk posed to the financial system by the rapidly increasing size of regional banks.

=== U.S. investigations ===
The collapse of Silicon Valley Bank itself also spurred federal investigations from the U.S. Securities and Exchange Commission as well as the United States Department of Justice. Within the scope of both probes is the sales of stock made by senior officers of Silicon Valley Bank shortly before the bank failed, while the SEC's investigation also includes a review of past financial-related and other risk-related disclosures made by Silicon Valley Bank to evaluate their accuracy and completeness.

Internal investigations at the FDIC and Federal Reserve noted that deregulation, not subjecting medium-sized banks to high scrutiny, reduced enforcement of remaining regulations, and government staffing shortages weakened oversight and allowed mismanagement of banks to cause their collapse.

=== Economic impact ===
As depositors began to move money en masse from smaller banks to larger banks, on Monday, March 13, shares of regional banks fell.

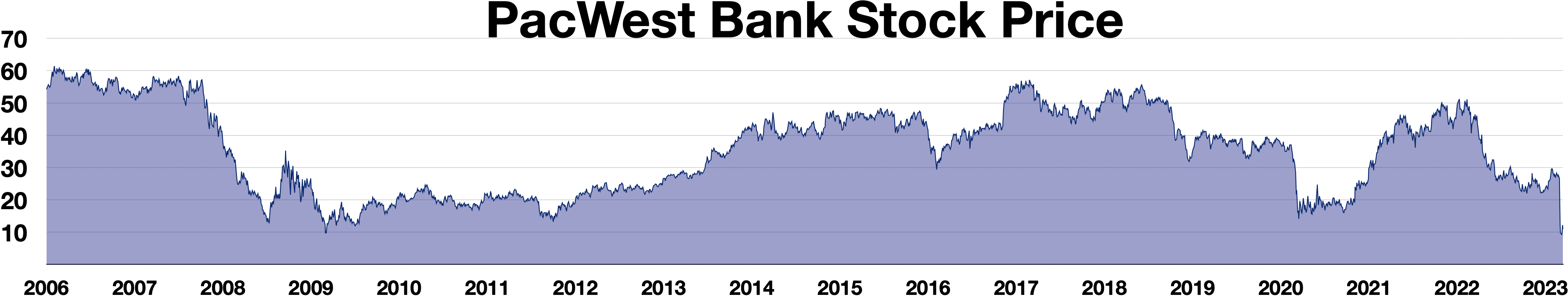
PacWest Bank stock price

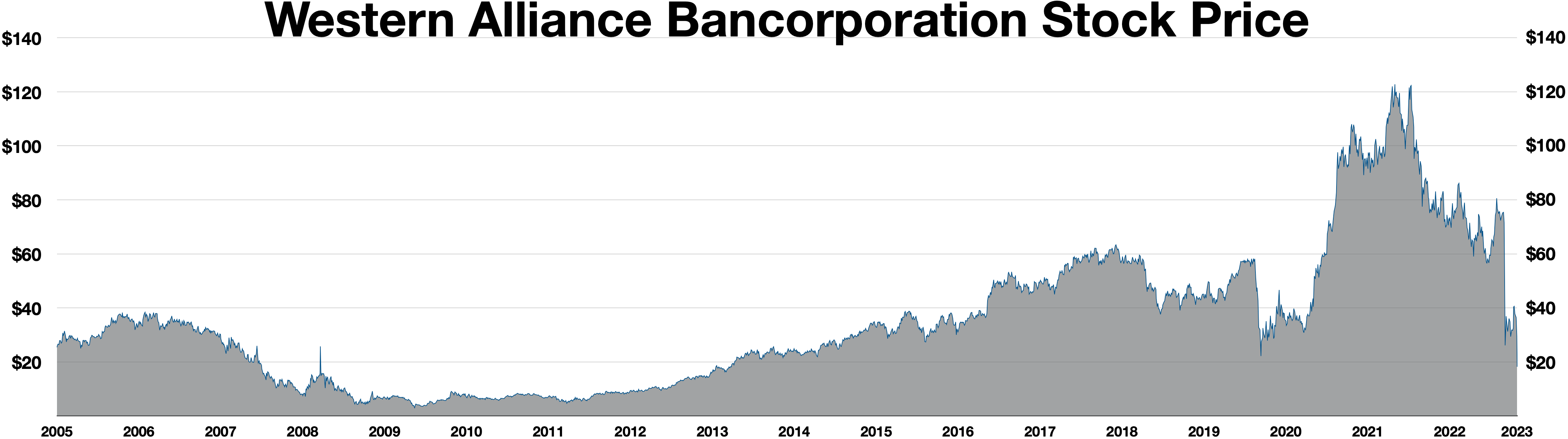
Western Alliance Bancorporation stock price

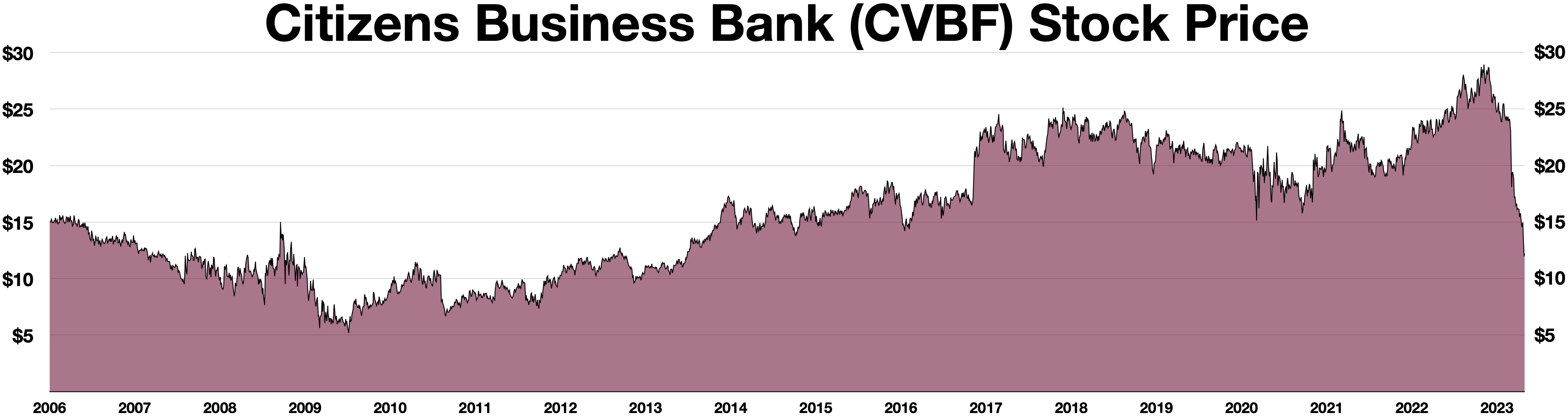
Citizens Business Bank stock price

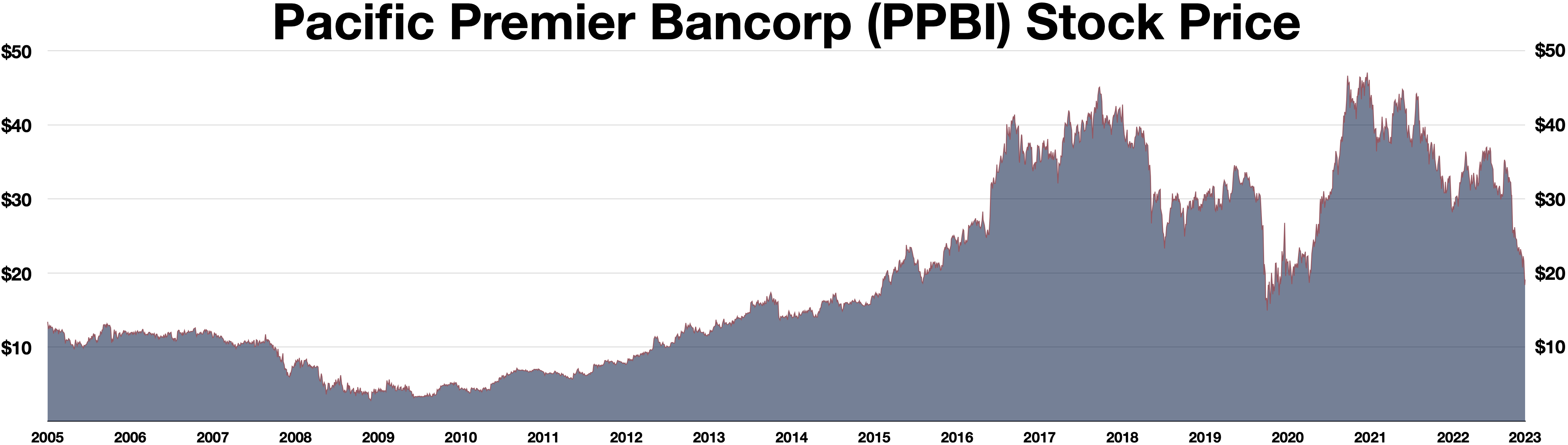
Pacific Premier Bancorp stock price

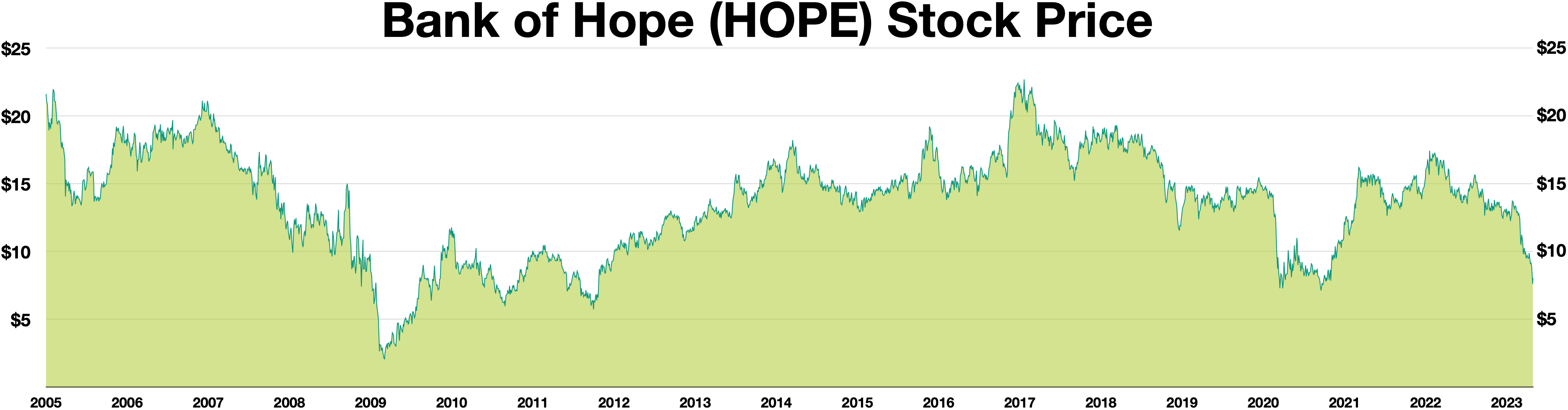
Bank of Hope stock price

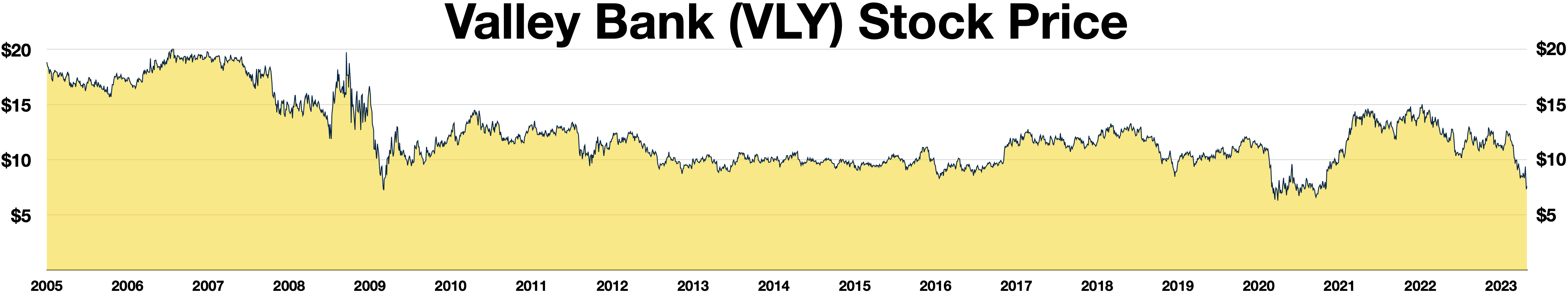
Valley Bank stock price

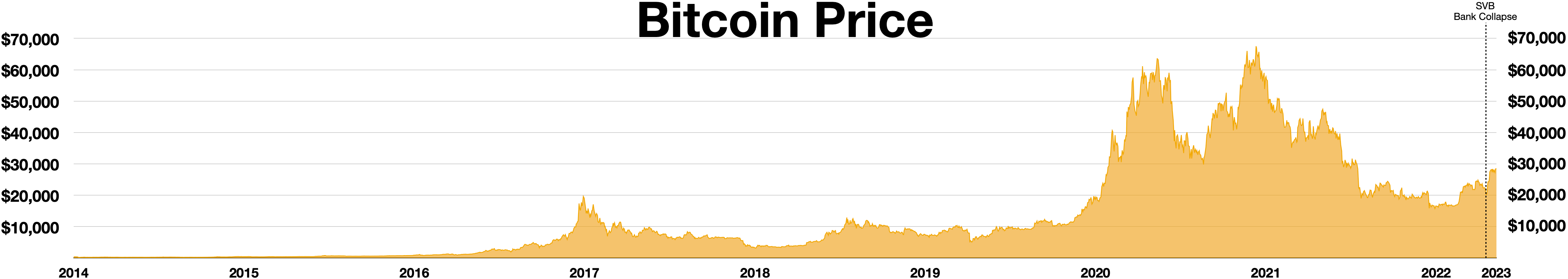
Bitcoin price

Following SVB and Signature's collapses, Western Alliance Bancorporation share price fell 47% and PacWest Bancorp was down 21% recovering after their trading was halted. Moody's downgraded its outlook on the U.S. banking system to negative, citing what it described as "rapid deterioration" of the sector's financial footing. It also downgraded the credit ratings of several regional banks, including Western Alliance, First Republic, Intrust Bank, Comerica, UMB Financial Corporation, and Zions Bancorporation. Large declines in regional bank stocks continued after First Republic's failure.

U.S. President Joe Biden made a statement about the first three bank failures on March 13, and asserted that government intervention was not a bailout and that the banking system was stable.

The initial bank failures led to speculation on March 13 that the Federal Reserve could pause or halt rate hikes. Beginning on March 13, traders began modifying their strategies in the expectation that fewer hikes than previously expected would occur. Some financial experts suggested that the BTFP, combined with a recent practice of finding buyers who would cover all deposits, may have effectively removed the FDIC's $250,000 deposit insurance limit. However, Treasury Secretary Janet Yellen clarified that any guarantee beyond that limit would need the approval of the Biden administration and Federal regulators.

The initial three bank failures and resulting pressures on other U.S. regional banks were expected to reduce available financing in the commercial real estate market and further slow commercial property development. The Federal Reserve's discount window liquidity facility saw around $150 billion in borrowing from various banks by March 16, more than 12 times the $12 billion that the BTFP provided. Since the majority of First Republic's long term assets were in municipal bonds, it was unable to make full use of the BTFP as those assets did not qualify as an eligible collateral.

By March 16, large inter-bank flows of funds were occurring to shore up bank balance sheets and numerous analysts were reporting on a more general U.S. banking crisis. Many banks had invested their reserves in U.S. Treasury securities, which had been paying low interest rates. As the Federal Reserve began raising rates in 2022, bond prices declined, decreasing the market value of bank capital reserves and leading some banks to sell the bonds at steep losses as yields on new bonds were much higher.

On March 17, President Joe Biden stated that the banking crisis had calmed down, while The New York Times said that the March banking crisis was hanging over the economy and had rekindled fear of recession as business borrowing would become more difficult as many regional and community banks would have to reduce lending.

Late on Sunday, the Federal Reserve and several other central banks announced significant USD liquidity measures in order to calm market turmoil. In a "coordinated action to enhance the provision of liquidity through the standing U.S. dollar swap line arrangements", the U.S. Federal Reserve, the Bank of Canada, Bank of Japan, European Central Bank, and Swiss National Bank joined to organize daily U.S. dollar swap operations. These swaps had previously been set up to occur on a weekly cadence.

The share price of PacWest had fallen sharply on 3 May after the bank announced that it was 'considering strategic options including a sale'. On 4 May share trading was suspended as the sell-off marked a further 42% loss with other US regional banks, including First Horizon, Metropolitan Bank and Western Alliance, also being affected.

In May 2023, FDIC proposed imposing higher fees on an estimated 113 of the largest banks to cover the costs of bailing out uninsured depositors.

=== International impact ===
By 19 March, concerns about the banking sector internationally had increased. That day, Swiss bank UBS Group AG bought its smaller competitor Credit Suisse in an emergency arrangement brokered by the Swiss government. One month before the events in the United States, Credit Suisse had announced its largest annual loss since the 2008 financial crisis, as clients continued withdrawing their cash at a rapid pace; $147 billion had been withdrawn in the fourth quarter of 2022. It also disclosed it had found "material weaknesses" in its financial reporting. Its largest investor, Saudi National Bank, announced on March 15 that it would not purchase more shares of Credit Suisse due to regulatory issues. The resulting interview clip was shortned and widely circulated as the Saudi bank's refusal to bail out Credit Suisse, resulting in further of spread panic. Its share price plunged 25% on the news and UBS stepped in to buy the bank. Axel Lehmann, former chairman of the bank, later sought to blame the American bank failures for triggering Credit Suisse's demise, though other analysts disputed that characterization. The bank had experienced many years of multi-billion dollar losses, scandals, executive turnover and weak business strategy.

Late on Sunday the Federal Reserve and several other central banks announced significant USD liquidity measures in order to calm market turmoil. In a "coordinated action to enhance the provision of liquidity through the standing U.S. dollar swap line arrangements", the U.S. Federal Reserve, the Bank of Canada, Bank of Japan, European Central Bank (ECB) and Swiss National Bank joined to organize daily U.S. dollar swap operations. These swaps had previously been set up to occur on a weekly cadence.

On 21 March, The Business Times reported that Asian central banks were "unlikely to be greatly influenced by the banking crisis in the United States and Europe", but Australia's central bank governors met and publicly indicated a potential pause in recent rate hikes. ABC News reported that the challenge for central banks is determining if the "banking turmoil close to crashing the real economy, or is inflation still the greater threat." In Japan the three main lenders, Mitsubishi UFJ Financial Group, Sumitomo Mitsui Financial Group and Mizuho Financial Group, lost share value between 10% and 12% due to the market turmoil and their exposure to the bond market. Japan's central bank held a crisis meeting in mid-March while the Topix banks index fell 17%. The fall was led by fears over the SVB collapse and the risks in Japan's regional banking sector, partly because of exposure to US interest rate hikes.

The cost to insure against default on Deutsche Bank debt rose substantially on Friday, 24 March, with the 5-year CDS for the bank's debt rising 70%. The ECB and other European central banks raised interest rates the same day. The European STOXX 600 index fell around 4% with shares in Deutsche Bank down more than 14% at one point, closing the day at a loss of around 8%. The UK's banking index also fell around 3% led by falls of around 6% for both Barclays and Standard Chartered and a 4% drop for NatWest. Shares in other European banks also fell, among them Commerzbank, Austria's Raiffeisen Bank and the French Société Générale. According to the European Commission's Paolo Gentiloni, finance ministers in the Euro zone called on the commission to close loopholes in Crisis Management and Deposit Insurance (CMDI) provision, starting in the second quarter of 2023.

Chinese banks experienced little negative effect. According to Bloomberg News, almost all of the 166 top performers during the market turmoil were in China. The banking crisis in the U.S. and Europe highlighted the relative stability of the Chinese banking system. While China's recovery from the pandemic remains fragile, inflation there is muted, and the People's Bank of China had adjusted interest rates at a slower pace than Western central banks.

The turbulence in the financial system caused India's central bank to put any further hikes in interest rates on hold on 6 April, with governor Shaktikanta Das saying, "it's a pause not a pivot". A 25 basis point increase had been widely expected. Central banks in Australia, Canada and Indonesia also paused any further increases.

While rising interest rates give banks greater returns on customer's loans, the tighter financial conditions meant the sector saw a downturn in equity funding, with the S&P 500 bank index (SPXBK) in April down 14% year to date on expectation of lower quarterly earnings for some US banks. Effects on the secondary market were also expected. On 11 April the International Monetary Fund downgraded its forecast for GDP growth globally in 2023 from 2.9% to 2.8%, saying "Uncertainty is high and the balance of risks has shifted firmly to the downside so long as the financial sector remains unsettled". The forecast marked a slowdown from 3.4% in 2022, but predicted growth could rise modestly to 3.0% in 2024. The IMF had been cutting its forecast since spring 2022.

== See also ==
- 1991 Indian economic crisis
- Inverted yield curve
- List of bank failures in the United States (2008–present)
- List of banks acquired or bankrupted in the United States during the 2008 financial crisis
- List of stock market crashes and bear markets
- Norinchukin Bank
- Stock market crash
- Stock market crashes in India
- Yield curve control
