= LDR =

LDR may refer to:

== People ==
- Lana Del Rey, American singer-songwriter

== Politics ==
- Liberal Democrat and Reform Party, European Parliament
- Laos Democratic Republic
- Local Democracy Reporter, United Kingdom

== Computing ==
- LDraw filename extension
- Low-dynamic-range rendering in 3D computer graphics

== Science ==
- Light-dependent resistor, a type of electrical component
- Lateral digit reduction, a phenomenon of digit homology in the origin of birds

== Other ==
- Loan-deposit ratio
- Long-distance relationship of a couple
