= Bank Term Funding Program =

Federal Reserve bank loan program

The Bank Term Funding Program (BTFP) was a loan program for banks operated by the United States Federal Reserve since 2023. The Federal Reserve established BTFP to offer loans of up to one year to eligible depository institutions pledging qualifying assets as collateral, as a response to help stabilize the banking industry after the 2023 United States banking crisis. The program was introduced on March 12, 2023 and was set to expire in March 2024. It ceased extending new loans on March 11, 2024.

== History ==
=== Program creation and design ===
In response to the 2023 United States banking crisis in March 2023 involving multiple failures of American banks, in 2023 the United States government took extraordinary measures to mitigate fallout across the banking sector. On March 12, the Federal Reserve created the Bank Term Funding Program (BTFP), an emergency lending program providing loans of up to one year in length to banks, savings associations, credit unions, and other eligible depository institutions that pledge U.S. Treasuries, agency debt and mortgage-backed securities, and other qualifying assets as collateral.

The program was designed to provide liquidity to financial institutions, following the collapse of Silicon Valley Bank and other bank failures. It was also created to reduce the risks associated with unrealized losses in the U.S. banking system, which totaled over $600 billion at the time of the program's launch. Funded through the Deposit Insurance Fund, the program offers loans of up to one year to eligible borrowers who pledge as collateral certain types of securities including U.S. Treasuries, agency debt, and mortgage-backed securities.

The collateral is to be valued at par instead of open-market value, so a bank can borrow on asset values that have not been impaired by a series of interest rate hikes since 2022. The Federal Reserve also eased conditions at its discount window. The Department of the Treasury said it would make available up to $25 billion from its Exchange Stabilization Fund as a backstop for the program.

=== Usage ===
After its implementation on March 12, in late March 2023, $53.7 billion was borrowed from the program in one week, a sharp jump from the $11.9 billion the week prior. Amount borrowed fluctuated over the following months, and in December 2023 Bloomberg News reported that the use of BTFP funding had reached an all-time high, with a record $136 billion in borrowing in one week. As the newspaper noted, BTFP allowed banks and credit unions to borrow funds for up to one year. The borrowing rate from the BTFP again reached a new high in early January 2024, with $141 billion in borrowing in one week, beating the previous one-week high of $136 billion in December 2023. The Wall Street Journal published an article criticized the new lending increase as banks "gaming" the system, arguing the increases seemed unrelated to new market pressures.

=== Interest increases and expiration ===
In January 2024, the Federal Reserve said it would let the program expire on March 11, as scheduled. The Federal Reserve also raised the interest rate on new loans from the Bank Term Funding Program (BTFP). It also said loans outstanding in the program as of January 17, 2024 were $161.5 billion.

In February 2024, Barron's noted that while when the announcement to close the BTFP was made, "that made sense when it appeared that banks had made it through the worst of last year’s turmoil, brought on by the steep decline in the value of Treasuries and mortgage-backed securities. Now, the timing appears inconvenient at best given the problems that have shown up at New York Community Bancorp," as New York Community Bank had recently shown significant losses. William English, a Yale professor and former Fed official., was quoted saying the end of the program could be a "psychological issue" to the market by encouraging more withdrawals as investors "become worried about the Fed’s willingness to lend to support banks." Barron's argued the worry would be unfounded, as banks traditionally had other lending options.

=== Closure and impact ===
It ceased extending new loans on March 11, 2024.

Reuters wrote that the program closed "amid evidence it helped turn the tide of trouble that risked derailing the economy," noting "no bank of meaningful size" had failed in the United States since ten months, and the Fed had not changed policy. It noted that new loans had "all but dried up" after the Fed shut down the arbitrage advantages in late January, with the program's credit outstanding holding after that point at around $160 bln.

The last loan extended under the program was repaid on March 11, 2025, and the following day, the Federal Reserve Board released the loan-level data to the public. According to an analysis of that data by the Bank Policy Institute, the program made about 9,000 loans to 1,327 borrowers, with many repeat customers.

== Program specifics ==
BTFP lets banks, savings associations, credit unions, and other types of depository institutions use "Treasury and agency mortgage-backed securities as collateral for loans up to one year." Borrowers can prepay the loans without penalty, with advances allowed until March 11, 2024. According to the Wall Street Journal, the BTFP's "biggest draw" was that it allowed borrowing of funds "equal to the par value" of the pledged collateral, meaning the Fed would avoid looking at the market value of the collateral and interest rates would in many cases be lower that way.
