= Signature Bank =

American commercial bank

- Company type: Public
- Traded as: Expert Market: SBNY; Nasdaq: SBNY (2004–2023)
- Industry: Banking; Financial services
- Founded: May 1, 2001; 25 years ago
- Defunct: March 12, 2023; 3 years ago
- Fate: Failed due to systemic risk and taken into receivership by the Federal Deposit Insurance Corporation
- Successors: Flagstar Bank (acquisition of Signature Bank's loans and branches); Customers Bancorp (acquisition of Signature Bank's venture banking portfolio)
- Headquarters: New York City, New York, U.S.
- Key people: Scott Shay (chairman); Joseph J. DePaolo (president, CEO); John Tamberlane (vice chairman and director)
- Net income: ▲US$1.337 billion (2022)
- Total assets: ▼US$110 billion (2022)
- Total equity: ▲US$8.01 billion (2022)
- Number of employees: 2,243 (2022)
- Subsidiaries: Signature Securities Group Corporation; Signature Financial LLC; Signature Public Funding Corp.
- Website: Archived official website at the Wayback Machine (archive index)

Signature Bank was an American full-service commercial bank headquartered in New York City and with 40 private client offices in the states of New York, Connecticut, California, Nevada, and North Carolina. In addition to banking products, specialty national businesses provided services specific to industries such as commercial real estate, private equity, mortgage servicing, and venture banking; subsidiaries of the bank provided equipment financing and investment services. At the end of 2022, the bank had total assets of US$110.4 billion and deposits of $82.6 billion; as of 2021, it had loans of $65.25 billion.

Signature Bank was founded in 2001 by former executives and employees of Republic National Bank of New York after its purchase by HSBC. It focused on wealthy clients and built personal relationships with them. For most of its history, it had offices only in the New York City area. In the late 2010s, it began to expand its services and geographic reach, though it was most noted for its 2018 decision to open itself to the cryptocurrency industry. By 2021, cryptocurrency businesses represented 30 percent of its deposits.

Banking officials in the state of New York closed the bank on March 12, 2023, two days after the failure of Silicon Valley Bank (SVB). After SVB failed and in light of the closure of the cryptocurrency-friendly Silvergate Bank earlier in the week, nervous customers withdrew more than $10 billion in deposits. It was the third-largest bank failure in U.S. history. Two days after Signature was closed, it became known that the bank was being investigated by the United States Department of Justice concerning its failure to properly scrutinize clients' activities for signs of money laundering. At the time of its closure by state banking officials, the bank was rated as the fourth U.S. bank by uninsured banking deposits, with 89.3 percent of deposits being uninsured; internal reviews by the Federal Deposit Insurance Corporation (FDIC) and New York state regulators noted that Signature's risk control and corporate governance had not grown commensurate with an increase in deposits in the late 2010s and early 2020s.

On March 19, 2023, a week after the bank closure, the FDIC sold the resulting bridge bank, most of its deposits, and its 40 branches to New York Community Bancorp to be absorbed by its Flagstar Bank subsidiary. Some $4 billion in digital asset banking deposits and $60 billion in loans were excluded from the transaction. Customers Bancorp acquired Signature's venture banking portfolio and hired 30 of that unit's former employees.

== Establishment and expansion ==
Signature Bank opened on May 1, 2001. It was founded by Joseph J. DePaolo, the bank's president and chief executive officer; Scott A. Shay, chairman of the board; and John Tamberlane, vice chairman and director. DePaolo and Tamberlane had left Republic National Bank of New York after it was purchased by HSBC the year prior. Six branches were opened simultaneously across the New York City area, with the goal to cater to wealthy clients and middle-market business managers with $250,000 in assets: DePaolo described the target audience as "the guy who started his business in Brooklyn and is now worth $20 million". The bank was a subsidiary of Bank Hapoalim of Israel, which provided over US$60 million in initial capital. Among its first employees were 65 former Republic Bank employees, who left en masse on April 27, days before Signature opened its branches. The bank quickly grew to $950 million in assets by February 2003, ranking in the top five percent of US commercial banks just 20 months after being founded and beginning to turn a profit. It also made relatively few loans: adopting a strategy once used by Republic Bank, it put its assets in instruments with lower yields. This led to a net interest margin of 2.8 percent, lower than many comparable banks.

The bank completed its initial public offering in March 2004 and began trading on the NASDAQ under the symbol SBNY. While remaining solely focused on the New York metropolitan area, Signature continued to rapidly grow, becoming one of the fastest-growing public companies in New York and one of the fastest-growing public banks for loan growth. It made a practice of hiring bankers—and luring their clients—from recently merged banks; it emphasized personal relationships so thoroughly that it did not advertise and its bank branches did not have street signs. CEO DePaolo refused to decorate his office with art, finding it a sign of complacency, and usually ate a deli lunch at his desk. After the 2008 financial crisis, Signature's style of relationship banking led to years of double-digit increases in loans and deposits. From 2004 to 2014, its stock price rose 650 percent, a return 10 times the S&P 500 and double Silicon Valley Bank's parent, SVB Financial Group, the next highest-performing institution; a 2014 article in Crain's New York Business hailed Signature as "New York's most successful bank".

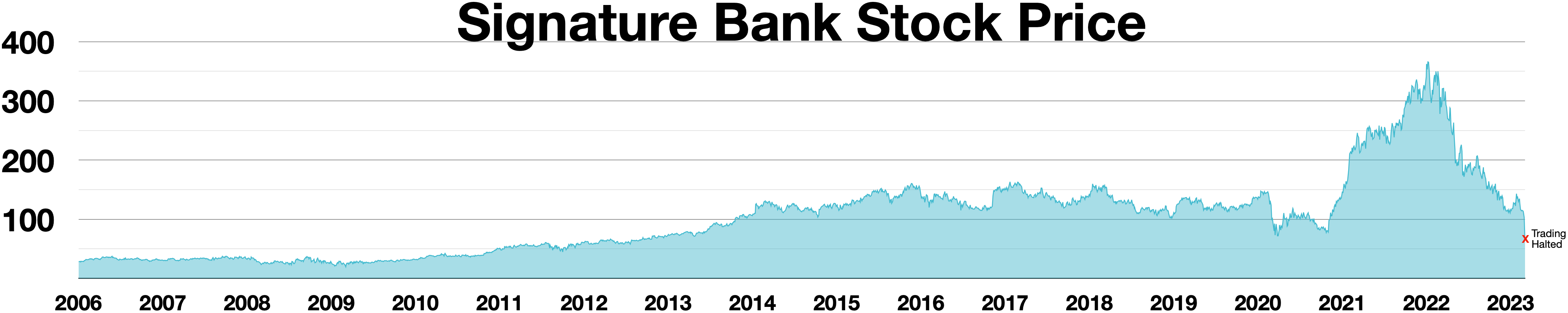
Signature Bank stock price

Beginning in 2007, it expanded into other areas of business, starting with the launch of a multifamily lending unit. The bank expanded into equipment finance in 2012 through its Signature Financial unit. Additionally, Signature cultivated a major business in servicing the New York area's law firms. An increase in loan activity offset its traditional reliance on mortgage-backed securities; its large capital cushion helped it to protect the many depositors whose accounts were larger than the Federal Deposit Insurance Corporation (FDIC)-insured $250,000. Signature Financial's taxi medallion lending business was hurt by the rise of car sharing platforms such as Uber. Signature continued to post profits despite losses associated with medallion loans. The bank's assets approached $50 billion by 2017.

In 2018, the bank expanded its footprint and commenced operations on the West Coast with the opening of its first private client banking office in San Francisco. The move came the year after DePaolo, once reluctant to expand beyond New York, opened the door to adding additional markets in comments made at an investors' conference. In 2020, the bank continued its expansion throughout southern California, opening new offices in Newport Beach, Woodland Hills, and Ontario. 2022 brought the opening of an office in Reno, Nevada, and a West Coast operations center in City of Industry, California.

In addition to the West Coast, Signature Bank also began a private client operation in North Carolina by luring a group of high-profile bankers from the former Square 1 Bank, a part of PacWest Bancorp, in 2019. By 2021, it was the fourth-largest bank by deposits in the Durham–Chapel Hill metropolitan area.

The bank's focus on commercial clients meant that it always had a high percentage of uninsured deposits—those beyond $250,000. However, in its final years, the bank's share of uninsured deposits increased significantly from 63 percent in 2018 to 82 percent in 2021 and 89.3 percent at its closure.

== Operations in the final years ==
=== General services ===
Signature Bank offered business and personal banking products and services with a focus on lending and deposits. The bank utilized a team model, paying its bankers on an "eat-what-you-kill" basis reminiscent of brokerage firms. In 2015, nearly 150 senior bankers reported directly to DePaolo; some made more than the CEO. It cultivated a reputation of being loyal to its clients, which in turn incentivized them to conduct further banking business with Signature. Irv Gotti became a loyal Signature customer after it allowed him to use its services while on trial for federal money laundering charges in 2005; even though he had not been found guilty, other banks refused to let him maintain accounts. Among the company's nine national businesses in 2022 were commercial real estate lending, fund banking for private equity investors, venture banking for the technology industry, specialized mortgage banking, and corporate mortgage finance. The fund banking business in particular had been a source of rapid growth; four years after being created, the fund banking portfolio had become Signature's largest asset, representing 41 percent of the bank's loan portfolio at the end of 2021.

In addition to banking products, two Signature subsidiaries provided additional services: Signature Securities Group Corporation, an investment advisory firm, and Signature Financial LLC, an equipment financing and leasing division.

On February 20, 2023, DePaolo, the bank's only CEO in its nearly 22-year history, announced his departure effective March 1—unrelated to the crash of the cryptocurrency bubble—to become a senior adviser; chief operating officer Eric Howell was to replace DePaolo as CEO at a later date. A later analysis by the Wall Street Journal found that DePaolo, Howell, and Shay had sold significant amounts of their Signature stock during the stock's cryptocurrency-fueled price surge in 2021, which eluded attention because the bank filed its insider trading reports with the FDIC, not the SEC, unusual for institutions of Signature's size. Only one other S&P 500 member, First Republic Bank, did not file insider trading reports at the SEC. Additionally, some of the reports it did file were mischaracterized.

Financials in billion U.S. dollars
	2007	2008	2009	2010	2011	2012	2013	2014	2015	2016	2017	2018	2019	2020	2021	2022
Revenue	0.311	0.351	0.421	0.509	0.623	0.697	0.787	0.959	1.144	1.360	1.506	1.732	1.973	2.007	2.311	3.711
Net income	0.027	0.043	0.063	0.102	0.150	0.185	0.229	0.297	0.373	0.396	0.387	0.505	0.586	0.528	0.918	1.337
Assets	5.845	7.192	9.146	11.67	14.67	17.46	22.38	27.32	33.45	39.05	43.12	47.36	50.59	73.89	118.4	110.4
Total equity	0.426	0.698	0.804	0.945	1.408	1.650	1.800	2.496	2.892	3.612	4.032	4.407	4.745	5.827	7.841	8.013

=== Cryptocurrency ===
Cryptocurrency became a focus of the bank's activities in its final years after deciding to accept customers from the industry in 2018, and the ability of cryptocurrency companies to utilize the services of banks like Signature gave the sector legitimacy and credibility. In 2021, more than 16 percent of its deposits came from the sector, a figure that had risen to 30 percent by February 2023. It also held reserves from the Circle-managed USDC. While cryptocurrency enthusiasts boosted the bank's stock from $75 to $375 a share in little over a year, this strategy proved risky and gave the bank an image of being a "crypto bank", a label founder DePaolo tried to shed in an interview with the Financial Times in July 2022. After consistently growing deposits, it began to experience outflows of deposits from the bank evenly split between crypto clients—as part of a strategy to actively reduce its deposits from digital asset lending—and its New York private banking customers, some of whom sought higher yields from accounts at other institutions as interest rates rose. Some investors privately raised concern about liquidity: per the Financial Times, "as Signature banks eight of the 12 largest crypto brokers, for instance, an implosion of the industry in a credit crunch could see their deposits rapidly evaporate". The bank, in response, reduced its involvement in the sector and pushed out some $1.5 billion in cryptocurrency-related deposits. After the bank collapsed, a report from Bloomberg News indicated that the United States Department of Justice and United States Securities and Exchange Commission (SEC) were investigating Signature to see if it sufficiently scrutinized cryptocurrency-related transactions for potential money laundering. The Financial Times noted that Marc Cohodes, a short seller of Signature, had written the Department of Justice in January 2023 warning that the bank had served as "a facilitator, even if unwitting, for countless illegal crypto transactions" due to its lax procedures.

The core of its cryptocurrency business was Signet, a payment network opened in 2019 for approved clients that allowed the real-time gross settlement of fund transfers through the blockchain without third parties or transaction fees, similar to Ripple. By the conclusion of 2020, Signature Bank had 740 clients using Signet. In its 2022 annual report, the bank cited the use of Signet by payroll processing and logistics clients in addition to digital asset banking.

In analyzing the bank's failure, the FDIC report also highlighted the lack of awareness by Signature management that its cryptocurrency activities could cause risk to more traditional customers of the bank.

=== Controversies ===
On July 13, 2018, The New York Times printed a full-length article on Signature Bank being the "go-to bank" to Donald Trump and the Trump family. The bank helped finance Trump's Florida golf course. Trump's daughter Ivanka Trump served on Signature Bank's board of directors between 2011 and 2013, before stepping down on April 24, 2013. Throughout most of the 2010s, the bank provided loans to people connected with the Trump Organization, while Ivanka Trump sat on its board of directors. On January 11, 2021—in the aftermath of the January 6 United States Capitol attack—the bank closed two of Trump's personal accounts containing $5.3 million and called for him to resign from office, citing "the best interests of our nation and the American people".

Signature Bank provided financial support for re-election races to a number of United States senators for their support of the Economic Growth, Regulatory Relief, and Consumer Protection Act, according to Federal Election Commission data tallied by OpenSecrets. This bill eased regulations that had been imposed by the Dodd–Frank Wall Street Reform and Consumer Protection Act after the 2008 financial crisis, raising the threshold to $250 billion from $50 billion under which banks are deemed too big to fail, exempting Signature Bank from post-crisis oversight rules. "We find it ridiculous and unacceptable that by virtue of … growing one day past $50 billion, we will be burdened with rules intended for the mega 'too big to fail' banks," Scott Shay, chairman of Signature, said. Barney Frank, both a former U.S. congressman (1981–2013) and a member of Signature Bank's board of directors (2015–2023), had voted in favor of raising the Dodd–Frank threshold. He went on record in 2018 stating: "My being on the board has not changed my position on this at all. These efforts began well before I began at Signature Bank."

In 2019, the bank was the center of several protests due to mistreatment of tenants by landlords who receive loans from the bank. Signature was one of the largest multifamily lenders in the New York metropolitan area; in 2019, it had $16 billion in loans in this sector, second only to New York Community Bank. Despite these accusations, the Association for Neighborhood & Housing Development (ANHD) applauded the bank's commitment to responsible lending practices as it pertained to low- and middle income-tenants; the year before, under pressure from the ANHD and others, the bank had changed its policy to underwrite loans at current rents instead of market rates.

== Collapse ==
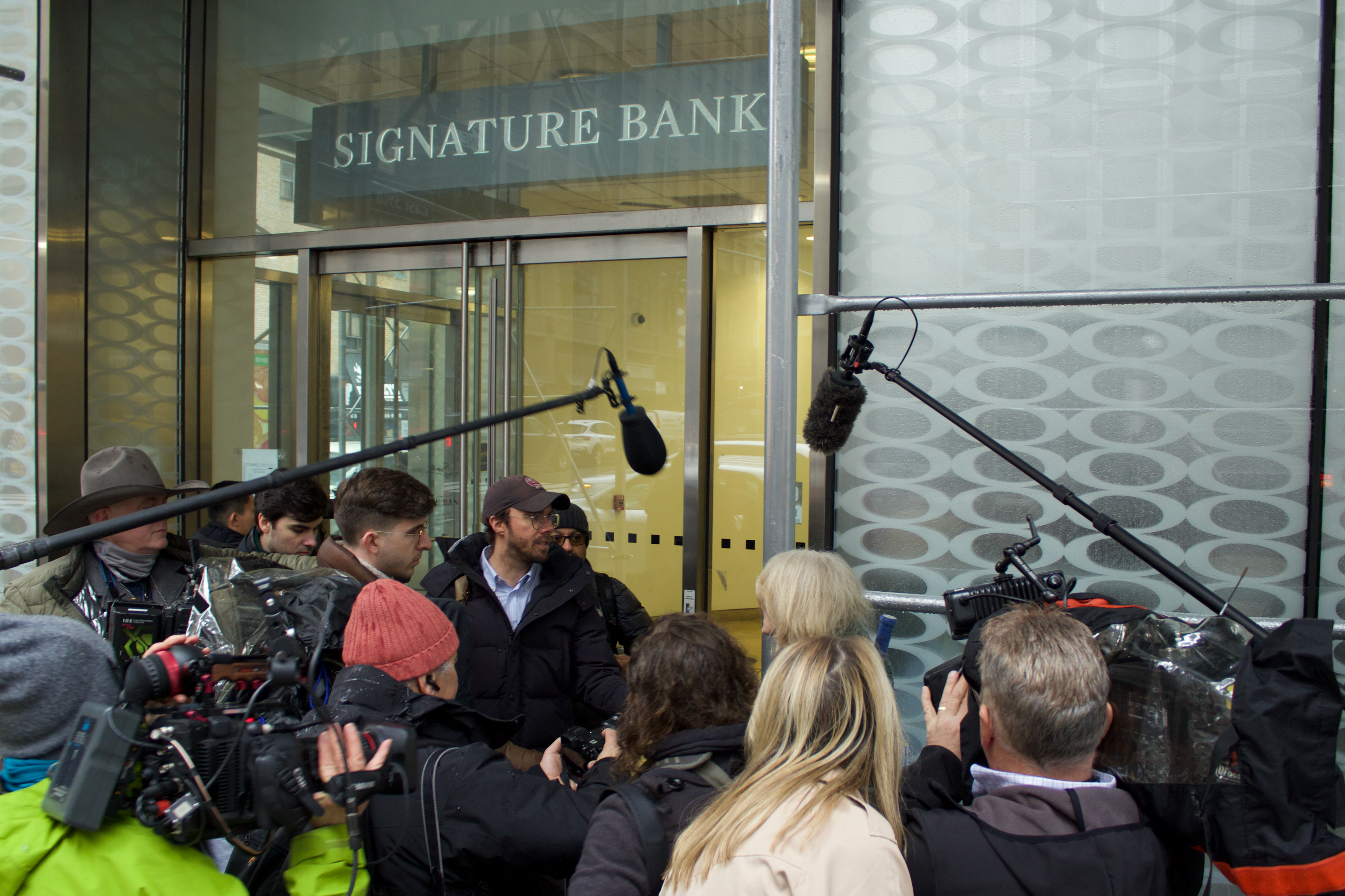
Reporters ask questions to Signature Bank customers exiting a New York location.

On Sunday, March 12, 2023, Signature Bank was closed by the New York State Department of Financial Services (DFS); New York state officials had wanted to take over the institution since Friday and began lobbying the Treasury Department, Federal Reserve, and FDIC to let it assume control of the bank. The bank proved unable to close a sale or otherwise bolster its finances before Monday morning, when it would have faced an avalanche of withdrawal requests placed over the weekend by nervous customers, in order to protect its assets after customers began withdrawing their deposits in favor of bigger institutions; it was losing deposits so fast that it was forced to ask the Federal Home Loan Bank of New York for money twice within 90 minutes. The bank's failure was designated as a systemic risk to the financial system, allowing for extraordinary measures to be taken to ensure the availability of funds beyond the Federal Deposit Insurance Corporation (FDIC)-insured $250,000. The DFS report later noted that Signature was dilatory in producing information to regulators in the crisis period and that the data regulators received was "inconsistent and ... continuously changed in material ways".

The FDIC was appointed as the bank's receiver and immediately established a bridge bank, which the FDIC would operate as it marketed its assets to bidders. The FDIC appointed Greg D. Carmichael, former president and CEO of Fifth Third Bancorp, as the bridge bank's CEO. As of December 2022, 90 percent of $89 billion in bank deposits exceeded the maximum insured by the FDIC. The FDIC, Federal Reserve, and Treasury Department issued a press release stating their expectation that all depositors would be made whole, while holders of Signature Bank equity and bonds lost their investment.

The closure came amid an ongoing string of United States bank failures, days after the collapse of Silicon Valley Bank and the failure of Silvergate Bank, the other major bank for the cryptocurrency industry. At the time of closure, the bank had $110 billion in assets. The bank failure was the third-largest in U.S. history, behind the Silicon Valley Bank collapse and Washington Mutual's closure in 2008.

The collapse was rapid in nature and surprised insiders. Even though the bank had experienced significant outflows of deposits on Friday, executives with the bank believed they were well-capitalized and could absorb the losses. Former U.S. congressman Barney Frank, who was a member of the bank's board, noted that in the wake of the SVB collapse, clients became concerned over the bank's exposure to crypto and withdrew their funds, resulting in an "SVB-generated panic" that only set in late on Friday. That day, according to Frank, customers withdrew more than $10 billion in deposits; a person familiar with the matter told Bloomberg said the bank had lost 20 percent of its deposits, or $16.5 billion based on its end-of-2022 total. Frank also was worried that regulators were specifically going after the cryptocurrency sector, stating, "I think part of what happened was that regulators wanted to send a very strong anti-crypto message." This sentiment was echoed by House Majority Whip Tom Emmer, who sent a letter to FDIC Chairman Martin J. Gruenberg inquiring about the possible purging of legal cryptocurrency activity in the U.S. under the guise of stabilizing the banking system. Analyst Christopher Whalen attributed the bank's failure to its cryptocurrency involvement, which he called a "huge error in judgment by veteran bankers". Former director and senator Al D'Amato noted that the bank's crypto venture caused Signature to "[take] their eyes off of that small entrepreneur" that had once been a focus of the company.

Signature's collapse had a significant effect on several industries. Circle informed customers that it could not mint or allow redemption of its USDC stablecoin through Signet after the bank closed. Coinbase, which held $240 million with Signature, noted that its customers' use of Signet would need to be confined to banking hours only. Crain's New York Business noted that Signature was one of the "most dependable" sources of funding for real estate transactions and renovation projects in the New York area alongside much larger banks, representing the majority of its $33 billion in outstanding mortgage-backed loans. It also was a major player in lending for rent regulated properties. One general manager on Broadway told The Hollywood Reporter that the seizure of the bank merited a "thank you note" to the federal government, as it was one of two major banks used by theater productions alongside City National Bank and some shows may not have been able to make payroll.

On April 28, the FDIC released its internal review, FDIC's Supervision of Signature Bank, and the Department of Financial Services released its internal review into Signature Bank's failure. The DFS report stated that "[Signature's] growth outpaced the development of its risk control framework", with regulators downgrading the bank's liquidity score in 2019. It also noted that withdrawals from the digital asset banking represented a proportionate share to their share of Signature's deposit base, downplaying the direct role of cryptocurrency clients and emphasizing that its high share of uninsured deposits and "crypto bank" reputation had been instrumental in its failure, as was a corporate governance structure inadequate in the face of rapid growth. The report stated, "The informal decision-making processes and organizational structure that previously supported the Bank were no longer adequate for the Bank's increasing size, complexity, and risk profile." The FDIC report noted similar concerns, stating that the Signature board and management "pursued rapid, unrestrained growth without developing and maintaining adequate risk management practices and controls appropriate for the size, complexity and risk profile of the institution". Both regulators also said that their internal staffing shortages resulted in insufficient oversight of the bank.

The FDIC estimated an impact to its Deposit Insurance Fund of $2.5 billion from the failure of Signature.

=== Disposition of assets ===
On March 19, 2023, the FDIC announced that certain deposits and loans of Signature Bridge Bank would be assumed by New York Community Bancorp, the parent of New York Community Bank, with the 40 branches to be absorbed by its Flagstar Bank subsidiary effective Monday, March 20.

The sale did not include approximately $60 billion in loans, which would remain in receivership. This included $11 billion in loans on rent-regulated apartment buildings, which had lost value since a 2019 law change that limited rent increases. Also not included were some $4 billion in deposits from the digital asset business, which would be repaid to depositors. The FDIC announced on March 28 that these customers would need to withdraw their funds and close accounts by April 5; those who did not would get their checks in the mail. In June, Customers Bancorp acquired Signature's $631 million venture banking portfolio from the FDIC at a 15-percent discount from book value and announced it had recruited 30 members of the former Signature venture banking unit.

At the end of July 2023, the FDIC launched a process to sell an $18.5 billion portfolio of private equity-linked loans held by Signature.

Blackstone emerged as the likely buyer of some $17 billion of Signature's commercial real estate loans in November 2023. Other firms bidding for the loans include Starwood and Brookfield.
