= Western Alliance Bancorporation =

Bank holding company headquartered in Phoenix

- Type: Public
- Traded as: NYSE: WAL; S&P 400 component
- Industry: Banking
- Founded: 1994; 32 years ago in Las Vegas, Nevada
- Headquarters: CityScape; Phoenix, Arizona, U.S.
- Area served: Arizona, California, and Nevada
- Key people: Bruce Beach (Chairman); Kenneth Vecchione (President & CEO); Dale Gibbons (Vice chairman & CFO)
- Net income: ▼US$709 million (2023)
- Total assets: ▲US$70.862 billion (2023)
- Total equity: ▲US$6.078 billion (2023)
- Number of employees: 3,260 (2023)
- Website: westernalliancebancorporation.com

Western Alliance Bancorporation is a regional bank holding company headquartered in Phoenix. It is on the list of largest banks in the United States and is ranked 97th on the Forbes list of America's Best Banks.

The company's banking subsidiaries include Alliance Association Bank, a commercial bank specializing in homeowner associations in Arizona; Alliance Bank of Arizona, a retail bank; Bank of Nevada, a retail bank in Clark County, Nevada; Bridge Bank, a commercial bank in the San Francisco Bay Area with loan production offices in nine states; First Independent Bank, a retail bank in western Nevada, and Torrey Pines Bank, a retail bank in Southern California. Western Alliance also owns AmeriHome Mortgage, a mortgage loan company.

== History ==
The bank was founded in 1994 in Las Vegas, Nevada.

In 2010, it moved its headquarters to Phoenix, Arizona.

In October 2012, it acquired Western Liberty Bancorp for $55 million.

In April 2021, the company acquired AmeriHome for $1.22 billion.

During the 2023 United States banking crisis, the company's share price fell due to its exposure to the technology sector and the amount of its uninsured deposits; however, the share price later rallied to new highs.
