= Mexican Debt Disclosure Act of 1995 =

United States statute requiring economic reports regarding the currency crisis in Mexico

- Long title: An Act to require a report on United States support for Mexico during its debt crisis, and for other purposes.
- Acronyms (colloquial): MDDA
- Nicknames: Emergency Supplemental Appropriations and Rescissions for the Department of Defense to Preserve and Enhance Military Readiness Act of 1995
- Enacted by: the 104th United States Congress
- Effective: April 10, 1995

Citations
- Public law: 104-6
- Statutes at Large: 109 Stat. 73 aka 109 Stat. 89

Codification
- Titles amended: 31 U.S.C.: Money and Finance
- U.S.C. sections amended: 31 U.S.C. ch. 53, subch. I § 5302

Legislative history
- Introduced in the House as H.R. 889 by Bob Livingston (R–LA) on February 10, 1995; Committee consideration by House Appropriations, Senate Appropriations; Passed the House on February 22, 1995 (262-165 Roll call vote 154, via Clerk.House.gov); Passed the Senate on March 16, 1995 (97-3 Roll call vote 108, via Senate.gov); Reported by the joint conference committee on April 5, 1995; agreed to by the House on April 6, 1995 (343-80 Roll call vote 296, via Clerk.House.gov) and by the Senate on April 6, 1995 (agreed voice vote); Signed into law by President Bill Clinton on April 10, 1995

The Mexican Debt Disclosure Act is a law of the United States formulating congressional oversight and monetary policy, through reports of the US president and the US treasury, to support the strength of the 1995 peso currency of Mexico; all resulting from speculative capital flight and the Mexican peso crisis of 1994. The Act required the submission of monthly reports by the United States Secretary of the Treasury concerning all international guarantees, long-term, and short-term currency swaps with the federal government of Mexico. The U.S. Congressional bill required the submission of semi-annual reports by the President of the United States concerning presidential certifications of all international credits, currency swaps, guarantees, and loans through the exchange stabilization fund to the government of Mexico.

The U.S. legislative bill was introduced in the United States Senate as S. 384 on February 10, 1995. The U.S. Congressional S. 384 bill was superseded by H.R. 889 on April 4, 1995. The H.R. 889 legislation was passed by the 104th United States Congress on April 6, 1995 and enacted into law by the 42nd President of the United States Bill Clinton on April 10, 1995.

The document leading to this law was a unilateral program drafted by the Clinton administration for an expedited help to Mexico not requiring congress approval.

== Proclamations of the Act ==
=== Short Title ===
This title is cited as the Mexican Debt Disclosure Act of 1995.

=== Congressional Assessment ===
104th U.S. Congress finds —

(1) Mexico is an important neighbor and trading partner of the United States
(2) On January 31, 1995, the President of the United States approved a program of assistance to Mexico, in the form of swap facilities and securities guarantees in the amount of $20,000,000,000 (Mex$125,600,000,000) using the exchange stabilization fund
(3) Program of assistance involves the participation of the Board of Governors of the Federal Reserve System, International Monetary Fund, Bank for International Settlements, International Bank for Reconstruction and Development, Inter-American Development Bank, Bank of Canada, and several Latin American countries
(4) Involvement of the exchange stabilization fund and the Board of Governors of the Federal Reserve System means that United States taxpayer funds will be used in the assistance effort to Mexico
(5) Assistance provided by the International Monetary Fund, International Bank for Reconstruction and Development, and Inter-American Development Bank may require additional United States contributions of taxpayer funds to those entities
(6) Immediate use of taxpayer funds and the potential requirement for additional future United States contributions of taxpayer funds necessitates congressional oversight of the disbursement of funds
(7) Efficacy of the assistance to Mexico is contingent on the pursuit of sound economic policy by the Government of Mexico

=== Presidential Reports ===
(a) Reporting Requirement — Not later than June 30, 1995, and every six months thereafter, President of the United States shall transmit to the appropriate congressional committees a report concerning all guarantees issued to, and short-term and long-term currency swaps with the Government of Mexico by the United States Government, including the Federal Reserve Board of Governors
(b) Contents of Reports — Each report shall contain a description of the following actions taken, or economic situations existing, during the preceding six month period or, in the case of the initial report, during the period beginning on the date of enactment of this Act:

(1) Changes in wage, price, and credit controls in the Mexican economy
(2) Changes in taxation policy of the Government of Mexico
(3) Specific actions taken by the Government of Mexico to further privatize the economy of Mexico
(4) Actions taken by the Government of Mexico in the development of regulatory policy that significantly affected the performance of the Mexican economy
(5) Consultations concerning the program approved by the President, including advice on economic, monetary, and fiscal policy, held between the Government of Mexico and the U.S. Secretary of the Treasury (including any designee of the Secretary) and the conclusions resulting from any periodic reviews undertaken by the International Monetary Fund pursuant to the Fund's loan agreements with Mexico
(6) All outstanding loans, credits, and guarantees provided to the Government of Mexico, by the United States Government, including the Federal Reserve Board of Governors, set forth by category of financing
(7) Progress the Government of Mexico has made in stabilizing the peso and establishing an independent central bank or currency board

(c) Summary of Treasury Department Reports — In addition to the information required, each report required shall contain a summary of the information contained in all reports submitted during the period covered by the report

=== Reports by the Secretary of the Treasury ===
(a) Reporting Requirement — Beginning on the last day of the first month which begins after the date of enactment of this Act, and on the last day of every month thereafter, Secretary of the Treasury shall submit to the appropriate congressional committees a report concerning all guarantees issued to, and short-term and long-term currency swaps with the Government of Mexico by the United States Government, including the Federal Reserve Board of Governors
(b) Contents of Reports — Each report shall include a description of the following actions taken, or economic situations existing, during the month in which the report is required to be submitted:

(1) Current condition of the Mexican economy
(2) Reserve positions of the central Bank of Mexico and data relating to the functioning of Mexican monetary policy
(3) Amount of any funds disbursed from the exchange stabilization fund pursuant to the program of assistance to the Government of Mexico approved by the President on January 31, 1995
(4) Amount of any funds disbursed by the Federal Reserve Board of Governors pursuant to the program of assistance
(5) Financial transactions, both inside and outside of Mexico, made during the reporting period involving funds disbursed to Mexico from the exchange stabilization fund or proceeds of Mexican Government securities guaranteed by the exchange stabilization fund
(6) All outstanding guarantees issued to, and short-term and medium-term currency swaps with, the Government of Mexico by the Secretary of the Treasury, set forth by category of financing
(7) All outstanding currency swaps with the central bank of Mexico by the Federal Reserve Board of Governors and the rationale for, and any expected costs of, such transactions
(8) Amount of payments made by customers of Mexican petroleum companies that have been deposited in the account at the Federal Reserve Bank of New York established to ensure repayment of any payment by the United States Government, including the Federal Reserve Board of Governors, in connection with any guarantee issued to, or any swap with, the Government of Mexico
(9) Any setoff by the Federal Reserve Bank of New York against funds in the account
(10) To the extent such information is available, once there has been a setoff by the Federal Reserve Bank of New York, any interruption in deliveries of petroleum products to existing customers whose payments were setoff
(11) Interest rates and fees charged to compensate the Secretary of the Treasury for the risk of providing financing

=== Termination of Reporting Requirements ===
The reporting requirements shall terminate on the date that the Government of Mexico has paid all obligations with respect to swap facilities and guarantees of securities made available under the program approved by the President of the United States on January 31, 1995

=== Presidential Certification Regarding Swap of Currencies to Mexico Through Exchange Stabilization Fund or Federal Reserve ===
(a) In General — Notwithstanding any other provision of law, no loan, credit, guarantee, or arrangement of a swap of currencies to Mexico through the exchange stabilization fund or by the Federal Reserve Board of Governors may be extended or (if already extended ) further utilized, unless and until the President submits to the appropriate congressional committees a certification that —

(1) there is no projected cost (as defined in the Credit Reform Act of 1990) to the United States from the proposed loan, credit, guarantee, or currency swap
(2) all loans, credits, guarantees, and currency swaps are adequately backed to ensure that all United States funds are repaid
(3) Government of Mexico is making progress in ensuring an independent central bank or an independent currency control mechanism
(4) Mexico has in effect a significant economic reform effort
(5) President has provided the documents described in H.Res. 80, adopted March 1, 1995

(b) Treatment of Classified or Privileged Material — For purposes of the certification required, the President shall specify, in the case of any document that is classified or subject to applicable privileges, that, while such document may not have been produced to the House of Representatives, in lieu thereof it has been produced to specified Members of Congress or their designees by mutual agreement among the President, the Speaker of the House, and the chairmen and ranking members of the Committee on Banking and Financial Services, the Committee on International Relations, and the Permanent Select Committee on Intelligence of the House

=== Definitions ===
For purposes of this title, the following definitions shall apply :

(1) Appropriate Congressional Committees — The term "appropriate congressional committees " means the Committees on Appropriations, International Relations, and Banking and Financial Services of the House of Representatives, the Committees on Appropriations, Foreign Relations, and Banking, Housing, and Urban Affairs of the Senate
(2) Exchange Stabilization Fund — The term "exchange stabilization fund " means the stabilization fund referred to in Title 31, United States Code

== See also ==
1994 Mexican general election	Financial intelligence
1995 Zapatista Crisis	La Década Perdida
Cardinal Juan Jesús Posadas Ocampo	Latin American debt crisis
Caribbean Basin Initiative	Latin American economy
Currency crisis	Liquidity crisis
Early 1990s recession	Luis Donaldo Colosio
Economic history of Mexico	Office of Foreign Assets Control
Emerging market debt	Recession shapes
Financial crisis	Sudden stop (economics)

== Mexico Currency Valuation and United States Economic Relations ==
- Clinton, William J. (January 11, 1995). "Statement on the Economic Situation in Mexico - January 11, 1995". Internet Archive. Washington, D.C.: National Archives and Records Service. pp. 38–39.
- "Presidential Certification Regarding the Provision of Documents to the House of Representatives Under the Mexican Debt Disclosure Act of 1995" (PDF). U.S. DOJ ~ Office of Legal Counsel - Opinions. U.S. Department of Justice. June 28, 1996.
- "Mexico's Financial Crisis: Origins, Awareness, Assistance, and Initial Efforts to Recover". U.S. GAO ~ GGD-96-56. U.S. Government Accountability Office. February 23, 1996. OCLC 34371460.
- "Financial Crisis Management: Four Financial Crises in the 1980s". U.S. GAO ~ GGD-97-96. U.S. Government Accountability Office. May 1, 1997. OCLC 524714257.
