= Carter bonds =

Series of US Treasury bonds

Carter bonds were a series of United States Treasury securities issued in 1978 and 1979 under the administration of President Jimmy Carter. Unusually for Treasury securities, they were denominated in foreign currencies, namely West German marks and Swiss francs. Their purpose was to acquire reserves of those currencies for the Treasury's Exchange Stabilization Fund, which then traded them for dollars in circulation, thereby supporting the dollar and restraining inflation.
