= Archie Lochhead =

American bureaucrat (1892–1971)

Archie Lochhead (November 17, 1892 – January 15, 1971) was the first Director of the Exchange Stabilization Fund, Technical Assistant to Secretary of the Treasury Henry Morgenthau Jr. under the Franklin D. Roosevelt administration, and President of the Universal Trading Corporation. He also served as monetary advisor to the Chinese Ministry of Finance, and was awarded the Grand Cordon of the Order of Brilliant Star by the Chinese Nationalist government "in recognition of his meritorious services."

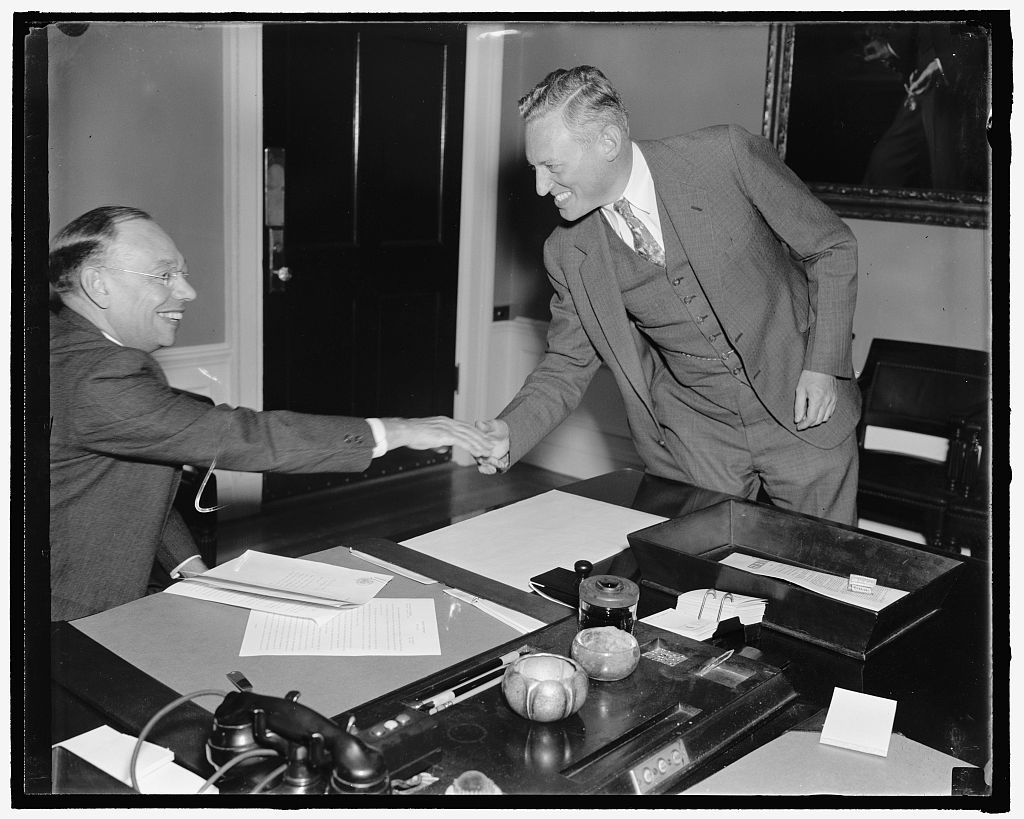
Lochhead (right) in 1937

== Early life ==
Archie Lochhead was born in New York City in 1892, to Scottish immigrant parents Elizabeth Potter Lochhead and James McDougall Lochhead. His father was a marine engineer who died at sea aboard the steamship Alvo in August 1893. Archie was thereafter raised by his mother in New York City. He graduated at the top of his class from the High School of Commerce in 1911 where he wrote his high school thesis on central banking.

== Brown Brothers and World War I service ==
Upon graduation from high school, Archie obtained a position as a mailroom clerk and addressograph operator at Brown Brothers. While attending night school at New York University, he was transferred to the Foreign Department and began trading currencies for the bank.

After the outbreak of World War I, Lochhead volunteered for duty in the Army. He was selected for the Army Air Corps, then in its infancy, and received his certification as an aviator pilot.

He returned to work at Brown Brothers after the war, where he became an expert in foreign exchange, and resumed night classes at New York University.

== The Chemical Bank and US Treasury ==
In 1920, Lochhead accepted a position at the Chemical Bank in New York. Several years later, he was made the head of the bank’s Foreign Department. While there, he helped found The Foreign Exchange Club of New York and was elected its President.

Henry Morgenthau Jr. was appointed Secretary of the Treasury in 1933. However, his lack of financial experience demanded a "brain trust" of advisers. Lochhead became Technical Assistant to Morgenthau in 1933, hired for his expertise in the field of finance and foreign exchange. Lochhead advised Morgenthau on the nation's domestic and foreign financial operations, and was primarily responsible for setting up the Government's "Foreign Exchange Department" under the newly established two billion dollar Exchange Stabilization Fund.

Working behind the scenes as Director of the fund, Lochhead was given complete control over its day-to-day management to successfully stabilize the external value of the dollar. He operated the fund at a profit, achieved a settlement of all foreign accounts every day, and never allowed the Treasury to become uncollateralized in its temporary holdings of foreign exchange. He kept the dollar stable, and did all the buying for foreign silver under the 1934 Silver Purchase Act The fund’s operations were confidential.

== The Universal Trading Corporation ==
Lochhead declined an appointment as Assistant Secretary of the Treasury in 1939, resigning from government service to become President of the Universal Trading Corporation in New York. He was succeeded at the Stabilization Fund by H. Merle Cochran.

The Universal Trading Corporation was set up to enable mutually profitable trade between the United States and China, and was wholly owned by the Chinese government. Lochhead was hired for his expertise in US business and finance and his long-term relationships with officials in the Chinese banking community.

The United States' Import-Export bank had advanced China $25 million in 1938 to buy war supplies in the fight against Japan, with the money to be paid back through sale of strategic goods such as tin and tung oil. The Universal Trading Corporation served as the purchasing agency for the Chinese Nationalist Government for all purchasing requirements for the United States. It was primarily focused on tung oil imports for the United States, one of China’s most valuable exports at the time, and a primary ingredient in the manufacture of paint in the 1930s and 40s. Lochhead was awarded the Order of the Jade in 1948, and the Grand Cordon Order of the Brilliant Star in 1960 "in recognition of his meritorious services."

Lochhead died on January 15, 1971, at the age of 78 at his home in Verona, New Jersey.
