= Exchange Stabilization Fund =

Reserve fund of the US Treasury Department

The Exchange Stabilization Fund (ESF) is an emergency reserve fund of the United States Treasury Department, normally used for foreign exchange intervention. This arrangement (as opposed to having the central bank intervene directly) allows the US government to influence currency exchange rates without directly affecting domestic money supply.

At the end of 2025, the fund had $218.5 billion in total assets, $174.9 billion in total liabilities, and a $43.6 billion net position. Its liabilities included $173.2 billion in SDR certificates and SDR allocations.

== Background ==
The U.S. Exchange Stabilization Fund was established at the Treasury Department by a provision in the Gold Reserve Act of 1934. It was intended as a response to Britain's Exchange Equalisation Account. The fund began operations in April 1934, under director Archie Lochhead and financed by $2 billion of the $2.8 billion gold surplus the government had realized by devaluing the dollar. The act authorized the ESF to use its capital to deal in gold and foreign exchange to stabilize the exchange value of the dollar. The ESF as originally designed was part of the executive branch not subject to legislative oversight. The fund was originally authorized for two years, subject to extension by the President or Congress, and was made permanent under the Bretton Woods Agreement Act of 1945.

The Special Drawing Rights Act of 1968 made the ESF the recipient of IMF special drawing rights (SDRs) acquired by the US government. The ESF can convert SDRs into dollars on its account by issuing certificates against them and selling the certificates to the Federal Reserve, and later repurchase them when it has surplus cash. The Federal Reserve uses the certificates as a portion of the collateral for Federal Reserve Notes.

== Uses ==
The ESF was originally created to stabilize the international value of the dollar following the collapse of the gold standard. Under the Tripartite Agreement of 1936 the Treasury used the ESF to guarantee daily exchange rates under which it converted the dollar holdings of France and the United Kingdom to gold. Because the use of the fund was left at the broad discretion of the Secretary of the Treasury, it proved highly adaptable to changes in the international monetary situation. Over the course of decades, governments have repeatedly used it for urgent defense against dollar crises until long-term solutions could be found. The fund has also extended loans to foreign countries in the interests of the United States.

With the establishment of the Bretton Woods system, the ESF contributed the initial US share of capital to the IMF and retreated to a secondary role. During the first debt ceiling crisis in late 1953, the ESF used part of its gold reserves to buy back debt from the Federal Reserve and create additional borrowing space for the government. International concerns about John F. Kennedy's commitment to gold convertibility led to an outflow of gold from the United States in early 1961. In response the ESF returned to buying foreign currency long enough for the IMF to create a credit facility that allowed countries to settle payments through direct currency exchange instead of gold redemption. The new IMF facility did not fully resolve the problem of speculative attacks on the dollar. From 1962 onward the ESF intervened increasingly in currency markets, with the support of the Federal Reserve and special borrowings, to prevent drains on US gold. The termination of gold convertibility as part of the Nixon shock marked the ultimate failure of these efforts. Having no further need for gold, the ESF sold it at the statutory price to the Treasury, which then sold a portion at auction.

The U.S. government used the ESF to provide $20 billion in currency swaps and loan guarantees to Mexico following the 1994 economic crisis in Mexico. This was somewhat controversial at the time, because President Clinton had tried and failed to pass the Mexican Stabilization Act through Congress. Use of the ESF circumvented the need for approval of the legislative branch. In response, Congress passed and President Clinton signed the Mexican Debt Disclosure Act of 1995, which implicitly accepted the use of the ESF, but required reports to Congress every six months on the status of the loans. At the end of the crisis, the U.S. made a $500 million profit on the loans.

After the bankruptcy of Lehman Brothers in September 2008 triggered a run on money market funds, Treasury Secretary Henry Paulson offered to guarantee the funds using the ESF. Nearly all money market funds accepted the offer, helping to calm the market. The funds paid $1.2 billion in fees for use of the guarantee program and ultimately no guarantees were paid, but Congress prohibited the use of the fund to offer such guarantees in the future.

The CARES Act of 2020, which provided economic relief during the COVID-19 pandemic, temporarily removed the post-2008 restrictions on the ESF and made a spectacular appropriation of $500 billion. Of this amount up to $46 billion was available for loans or guarantees to air carriers and industries critical to national security, and the rest to support emergency credit facilities of the Federal Reserve. The ESF provided these facilities with contributions of equity to protect the Federal Reserve from losses on loans made under high-risk pandemic conditions. The CARES Act appropriation was temporary and accounted separately from the ESF's currency operation funds; the act required repayment of the appropriated funds by 2026, with any residual earnings paid to the Social Security Trust Fund. Outgoing Treasury secretary Steven Mnuchin withdrew equity from several facilities in November 2020, controversially and against the preference of Federal Reserve officials, and the Consolidated Appropriations Act, 2021 rescinded $479 billion in unused appropriations. At the end of 2025 the ESF owed $1.5 billion related to the CARES Act transactions.

Following the collapse of Silicon Valley Bank in March 2023, the ESF contributed $25 billion as a backstop for the Bank Term Funding Program, an emergency Federal Reserve credit program allowing banks to borrow against bonds on special terms.

In 2025, President Trump controversially signed a $20 billion "economic stabilization agreement" currency swap line with Argentina's central bank utilizing the ESF. This arrangement was designed to support the volatile Argentine peso, help stabilize the country's economy, curb inflation, and provide a financial lifeline to the government of President Javier Milei ahead of midterm elections. The U.S. Treasury has also directly intervened by purchasing pesos in the open market.

== See also ==
- Carter bonds
