= Citizens Business Bank =

Financial institution headquartered in Ontario, California

- Type: Public
- Traded as: Nasdaq: CVBF; through CVB Financial Corporation
- Industry: Financial services
- Founded: 1974; 52 years ago
- Headquarters: Ontario, California, United States
- Key people: David A. Brager (president and CEO)
- Products: Banking services
- Parent: CVB Financial Corporation
- Website: www.cbbank.com

Citizens Business Bank is an American bank that specialises in business accounts. The bank is headquartered in Ontario, California.

CVB Financial Corporation is the holding company for Citizens Business Bank. It has over $14 billion in total assets. The parent company is traded on the NASDAQ as CVBF.

As of 2021, the bank had 57 physical locations following a 2019 branch consolidation. Citizens earned the third spot in S&P Global Market Intelligence's 2022 Ranking of U.S. Public Banks by Financial Performance.

== History ==
The bank was founded as Chino Valley Bank in 1974.

In 2018, Citizens acquired Pasadena-based Community Bank, which was founded in 1945. In 1995, the company acquired Citizens Commercial Trust and Savings Bank, also of Pasadena. In 1994, the company assumed the operations of the failed Pioneer Bank of Fullerton, California.

Citizens Business Bank was the former name sponsor of the Toyota Arena in Ontario, California between the arena's opening in 2008 and 2019.
