= Customers Bank =

American bank holding company

Customers Bancorp, Inc.
- Formerly: New Century Bank; Customers 1st Bank; Customers USA
- Type: Public
- Traded as: NYSE: CUBI
- Industry: Financial services
- Founded: 1997; 29 years ago in Phoenixville, Pennsylvania, United States
- Headquarters: West Reading, Pennsylvania, United States
- Key people: Jay Sidhu (Executive Chairman); Sam Sidhu (President and CEO)
- Revenue: $801.41 million (2025)
- Net income: $224.09 million (2025)
- Total assets: $24.9 billion (2025)
- Total equity: $2.12 billion (2025)
- Number of employees: 870 (2025)
- Subsidiaries: Customers Bank
- Capital ratio: 13.0 percent (2025)
- Website: www.customersbank.com

Customers Bancorp, Inc. is a publicly traded bank holding company and parent of Customers Bank. The company has more than $26 billion in assets with over 800 employees located across Illinois, Massachusetts, New Jersey, New York, Pennsylvania and Washington, D.C., ranking in the top 100 banks in the United States. Sam Sidhu, is the President and Chief Executive Officer.Jay Sidhu is its executive chairman and the company is headquartered in West Reading, Pennsylvania.

== Overview ==
The holding company had an initial public offering on NASDAQ in 2013 under the ticker name "CUBI". The company is headquartered in West Reading, Pennsylvania and Jay Sidhu is chairman and chief executive officer. Its shareholders approved the formation of a bank holding company known as Customers Bancorp, Inc. in September 2011. Sidhu announced plans to file a $115 million initial public offering in 2012. The company had first filed the paperwork in April 2011 and was advised by investment bankers that it would not get the price it was seeking. Customers Bancorp then raised $100 million from investors and went public on May 17, 2013 selling 55 percent of its shares on the NASDAQ stock market, with the expectation of raising a total of $97.75 million.

== History ==
In June 1997, New Century Bank was founded as a private bank in Phoenixville, Pennsylvania by Ken Mumma. It had five branches in Pennsylvania. The bank had about $265 million in total assets and $229 million in deposits by 2009, however of its $226 million lending portfolio, $186 million was real estate-related and considered bad loans amidst the Great Recession. Jay Sidhu was contacted by New Century Bank after his noncompete agreement with Sovereign Bancorp had expired and was appointed to the bank's board as well as chairman of its executive committee in May 2009. The next month, Sidhu was announced as chairman and chief executive officer after helping the bank to raise $13.6 million in capital.

New Century Bank changed its name to Customers 1st Bank in April 2010 and announced a rebranding plan in addition to opening four branches. Customers 1st Bank reported to have $500 million in assets at that time. It acquired all of the deposits and assets of Port Chester, New York-headquartered USA Bank in July 2010. The next month, a federal court ruled that the Customers 1st Bank name infringed on Alliance Bank's trademark and it rebranded as Customers USA. The bank also announced the purchase of Berkshire Bancorp and its Berkshire Bank subsidiary as well as the acquisition of ISN Bank in Cherry Hill, New Jersey in 2010.

In 2015, Jay Sidhu and his daughter Luvleen co-founded BankMobile, an online bank that incubated under Customers Bank. It reached 100,000 customers within a year of launching. The company agreed to purchase Higher One Holdings of New Haven, Connecticut for $42 million in 2016 and reported that it would combine the acquisition with BankMobile.

T-Mobile announced a partnership with BankMobile in April 2019 to introduce a banking service for its wireless customers. At the time, BankMobile was considered one of the fastest-growing banks in the United States. Customers Bank moved its headquarters from Wyomissing to West Reading, Pennsylvania later that year. It was reported to have $11.7 billion in assets at that time.

In 2021, Sidhu's son, Sam, became president and chief executive officer of Customers Bank, after the announcement that Richard Ehst would be retiring. Sam was previously a board member for the bank, vice chair and chief operating officer, as well as head of corporate development for Customers Bancorp. That same year, the company announced that it would introduce "fintech-forward-focused banking" to its customers.

On August 8, 2024, the Federal Reserve Bank of Philadelphia announced an enforcement action against Customers Bancorp and Customers Bank Malvern, Pennsylvania after an examination found “significant deficiencies” in the bank’s risk-management and anti-money laundering practices. The notice singled out the bank’s “digital asset strategy” as an area of concern. The bank operates a blockchain-based real-time payments platform called Customers Bank Instant Token (CBIT) and counts a number of prominent digital asset firms as clients.

In 2024, American Banker named Customers Bancorp the best-performing bank with between $10 billion and $50 billion of assets, based on year-end 2023 data.

Customers Bancorp announced its leadership succession plan in 2025, with Sam Sidhu succeeding founder as Chief Executive Officer on January 1, 2026, while Jay Sidhu became Executive Chairman.

In April 2026, Customers Bank announced a multiyear strategic collaboration with OpenAI to deploy artificial intelligence across its commercial banking operations.

In 2026, Customers Bank ranked No. 45 among the 100 largest publicly traded banks on Forbes' 2026 America Best Banks list.
