= Depository institution =

U.S. financial institution legally allowed to accept monetary deposits from consumers

A depository institution is a non-banking financial institution (NBFI), also known as a nondepository financial institution (NDFI). It is a financial institution in the United States (such as a savings bank, commercial bank, savings and loan associations, or credit unions) that is legally allowed to accept monetary deposits from consumers. Under federal law, however, a "depository institution" is limited to banks and savings associations - credit unions are not included.

An example of a non-depository institution might be a mortgage bank, which, while licensed to lend, it cannot accept deposits.

== See also ==
- Authorised deposit-taking institution
- Shadow banking system
- Non-bank financial institution
