= Agency debt =

US government security

Agency debt, also known as an agency bond, agency loan, agency security, or "Agencies", is a security, usually a bond, issued by a United States government-sponsored enterprise or federal budget agency. The offerings of these agencies are backed but not guaranteed by the US government. Some prominent issuers of these securities are the Federal Home Loan Banks (FHLBanks), Federal National Mortgage Association (Fannie Mae) and Federal Home Loan Mortgage Corporation (Freddie Mac).

== Issuers and guarantees ==
Agency debt may be issued either by federal government agencies or by government-sponsored enterprises (GSEs), and the degree of federal backing depends on the issuer. FINRA notes that agency securities carry the full faith and credit of the United States only when they are issued or guaranteed by a federal government agency, such as Ginnie Mae. By contrast, securities issued by GSEs such as Fannie Mae and Freddie Mac are not, by virtue of that status alone, direct obligations of the U.S. government.

The Federal Reserve likewise distinguishes between “government-sponsored enterprise debt securities” and federal agency mortgage-backed securities in its descriptions of open market operations and balance sheet assets, reflecting the different legal status of those instruments.

== See also ==
- Mortgage-backed security
- United States Treasury security
