= Loan-to-deposit ratio =

Loan-to-deposit ratio (LTD ratio or LDR) is a ratio between the banks total loans and total deposits. The ratio is generally expressed in percentage terms

If the ratio is lower than one, the bank relied on its own deposits to make loans to its customers, without any outside borrowing. If on the other hand the ratio is greater than one, the bank borrowed money which it reloaned at higher rates, rather than relying entirely on its own deposits. Banks may not be earning an optimal return if the ratio is too low. If the ratio is too high, the banks might not have enough liquidity to cover any unforeseen funding requirements or economic crises. Banking analysts commonly used metric for assessing a bank's liquidity.

== By country ==
=== Pakistan ===
In Pakistan, loan-deposit ratio is known as the advance-to-deposit ratio (ADR) to describe the advances of loans to businesses and individuals out of total deposits. Since 2021, ADR tax is imposed on the banks in Pakistan if the ADR drops below 50. The Finance Act of 2021 imposed additional taxes on income from investments in federal government securities based on ADRs. The tax rates were set at 5%, 2.5%, and 0% for ADRs up to 40%, between 40 and 50%, and above 50%, respectively, in addition to a corporate tax rate of 39%.

The Finance Act of 2022 revised these rates, introducing higher additional taxes of 20%, 14%, and 0% for the same ADR categories while maintaining the corporate tax rate at 35%. Starting in the tax year 2023, the additional tax rates were adjusted to 16%, 10%, and 0%, with the corporate tax rate increasing to 39%.

In 2024, some banks in Pakistan, including Bank Alfalah, Bank of Punjab, and Habib Bank Limited, introduced a monthly fee on high desposits to reduce overall deposits and avoid ADR tax.
