= Better.com =

American mortgage origination firm

Better Home & Finance Holding Company
- Type: Public
- Traded as: Nasdaq: BETR
- Industry: Financial services
- Founded: February 24, 2014; 12 years ago
- Founder: Vishal Garg
- Headquarters: 1 World Trade Center, New York City, New York, United States
- Key people: Daniel Lewis, CEO; Paula Tuffin, CCO; Kevin Ryan, CFO; Vishal Garg, Director
- Services: Broker for mortgage origination, title insurance, and home insurance
- Revenue: ▲$164 million (2025)
- Net income: ▲ -$165 million (2025)
- Total assets: ▲$1.505 billion (2025)
- Total equity: ▲$37 million (2025)
- Owner: SoftBank Vision Fund (4.5 million shares); Vishal Garg (4 million shares); Activant Capital (2.6 million shares); Framework Ventures (1.2 million shares); Frontier Capital (0.9 million shares); Novator Partners (0.7 million shares)
- Number of employees: 1,329 (2025)
- Website: better.com

Better Home & Finance Holding Company doing business as Better or Better.com, headquartered in New York City, is an American financial technology company that provides mortgage origination, processing, underwriting, and closings via an online platform.

== History ==
=== 2014–2021: Early history ===
Better was founded in February 2014 by Vishal Garg after he and his wife encountered prolonged delays during their attempt to purchase a home and lost the bid to an all-cash buyer. To obtain operating infrastructure and state lending licenses, Garg acquired the California-based lender Avex Funding, which became the operating entity for the new company.

In January 2016, Better launched its consumer facing digital mortgage platform, Better Mortgage. In the same year, Better was approved as a Fannie Mae seller or servicer.

In 2019, the number of people from traditionally underrepresented groups buying homes through Better's mortgage lending platform increased significantly, a development that The New York Times suggested was linked to the company's digital processes and minimal reliance on human brokers.

In August 2019, Better closed a Series C round of US$160 million at a valuation of approximately US$600 million.

In November 2020, Better raised US$200 million in a Series D round led by L Catterton at a valuation of US$4 billion. In April 2021, Better received $500 million in funding from SoftBank Vision Fund at a $6 billion valuation.

In May 2021, Better announced an agreement to become publicly traded through a merger with Aurora Acquisition Corp., a special-purpose acquisition company (SPAC) sponsored by Novator Capital. In July 2021, Better acquired Trussle, a UK digital mortgage broker, for $9 million. In May 2025, it was sold to OneDome. In September 2021, Better acquired Property Partner, a London-based crowdfunding platform.

=== 2021–2023: Layoffs, lawsuits, and SPAC delay ===
In December 2021, Garg laid off 900 employees by videoconference and locked their electronic devices from accessing company material. Garg also made comments to employees that were deemed "unruly", telling employees that he "hired the wrong people" and referring to employees as "slow," "dumb," and "embarrassing". After much criticism, Garg took approximately a month off, returning in January 2022. The company was also criticized for adding 1,000 workers in India during the same year.

In March 2022, Better cut 3,000 additional positions in the United States and India, with notifications to some employees occurring through inadvertently issued severance payments before formal communications were sent. Better.com followed this with additional terminations across 2022, and the company's India-based subsidiary, which had grown to roughly 2,100 employees, was largely wound down through a voluntary-separation program. In May 2022, Harit Talwar was hired as chairperson. In June 2022, a former senior executive at Better filed a lawsuit alleging that the company misled investors in its filings. After an investigation by the U.S. Securities and Exchange Commission found no issues, the plaintiff voluntarily dismissed the case. In August 2022, a list of 250 or more US-based employees who were about to be terminated in another round of layoffs was leaked internally, leading to the termination of the employees who leaked the information. The company was accused of circumventing the Worker Adjustment and Retraining Notification Act of 1988 by laying people off in groups of 249 employees, under the 250 minimum that triggers the act. By 2023, the company's worldwide head count had fallen from approximately 11,000 in 2020 to about 950.

In February 2023, Better announced a deal with Amazon whereby Amazon employees are able to pledge their stock as collateral for a loan to cover the down payment on a house purchase, albeit at a slightly higher interest rate.

=== 2023-2024: SPAC merger, public listing, and restructuring ===
After multiple extensions, in August 2023, Better completed its reverse merger with Aurora Acquisition Corp. into Better Home & Finance Holding Company and received approximately US$565 million in capital, including a US$528 million convertible bond from affiliates of SoftBank and sales of common stock to funds affiliated with NaMa Capital (formerly Novator Capital).

In April 2023, Better acquired Birmingham Bank, a small Birmingham, England-based UK bank dating to 1955, for US$19.3 million; the purchase enabled Better to fund UK residential mortgages with consumer deposits. In June 2023, the company announced that it would wind down its in-house real estate brokerage, Better Real Estate, and shift to a partnership-based real estate agent model.

=== 2024–present: AI platform pivot and divestitures ===
After becoming a public company, Better shifted from a primarily direct-to-consumer originator toward a platform model centered on its artificial intelligence-based loan origination system, Tinman, and its voice computing-based AI loan assistant, Betsy.

In April 2025, Better restructured its outstanding convertible bonds, exchanging approximately US$534 million of principal held by affiliates of SoftBank for US$110 million in cash and US$155 million of new senior debt due 2028.

In May 2025, Better sold Trussle, which by then operated as Better.co.uk, to British property platform OneDome for an undisclosed sum.

In March 2026, Better launched an integration with OpenAI's ChatGPT Enterprise, providing loan officers a conversational user interface connected to Tinman's underwriting engine through a Model Context Protocol connector.

In April 2026, the company announced plans to divest Birmingham Bank.

In August 2026, Daniel Lewis replaced Garg as CEO.
