= Acquisition of Credit Suisse by UBS =

2023 banking merger in Switzerland

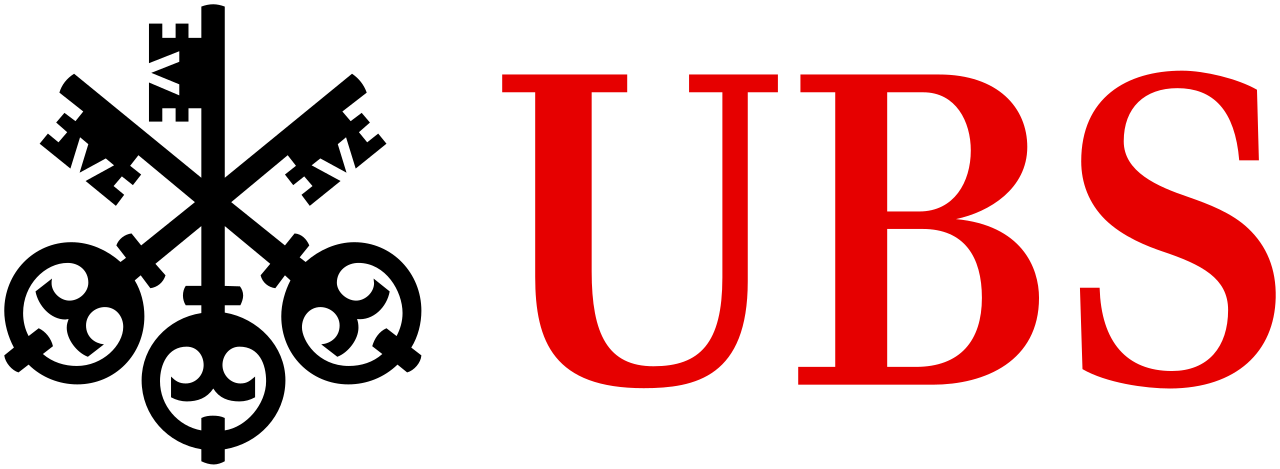

- Initiator: UBS
- Target: Credit Suisse
- Type: All-stock full acquisition
- Cost: CHF 3 billion (US$3.2 billion)
- Initiated: 19 March 2023
- Completed: 12 June 2023

On 19 March 2023, Swiss bank UBS Group AG agreed to buy Credit Suisse for CHF 3 billion (US$3.2 billion) in an all-stock deal brokered by the government of Switzerland and the Swiss Financial Market Supervisory Authority. The Swiss National Bank supported the deal by providing more than CHF 100 billion (US$104 billion) in liquidity to UBS following its takeover of Credit Suisse's operations, while the Swiss government provided a guarantee to UBS to cover losses of up to CHF 9 billion (US$9.6 billion) over the short term. Additionally, CHF 16 billion (US$17.2 billion) of Additional Tier 1 (AT1) bonds were written down to zero.

Credit Suisse is a globally systemically important bank whose investment banking unit, First Boston, had been recently tarnished by a series of high-profile scandals. The banking crisis in the United States had caused fear among global investors and led to panic over other possibly troubled banks. Credit Suisse's share price plunged after the leading shareholder ruled out further investment into the bank due to regulatory issues. The deal was rapidly agreed upon and announced just before the Asian financial markets opened on Monday morning in order to prevent "market shaking" turmoil in the global financial markets. Soon afterward, central banks across the world announced USD liquidity measures to try and ease wider market panic and avoid a wider banking crisis.

UBS completed the acquisition on 12 June 2023.

== Background ==
=== Credit Suisse and the 2008 financial crisis ===
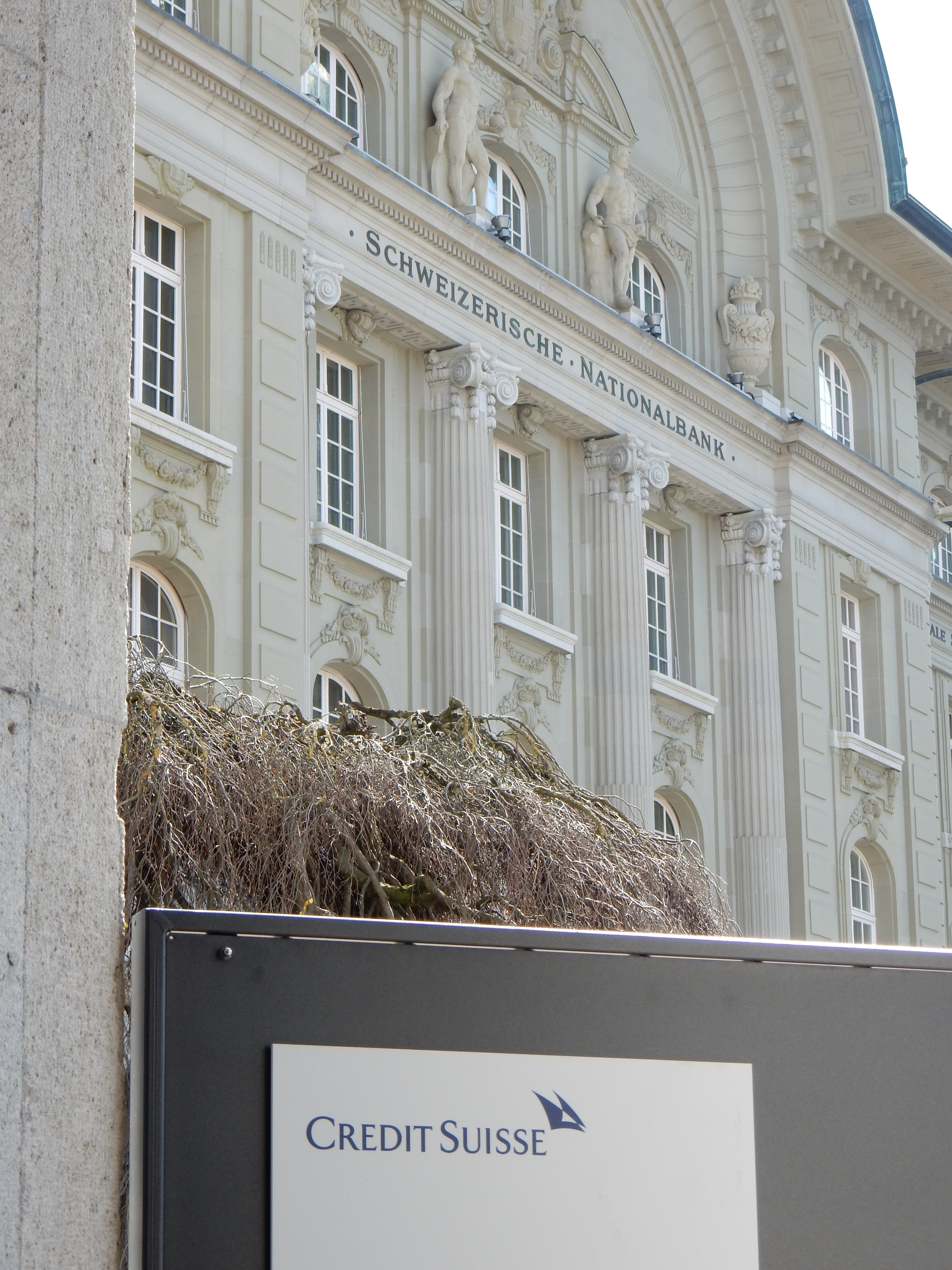
A Credit Suisse sign in front of the Swiss National Bank in Bern

Credit Suisse was founded in 1856. Over the next 150 years it became a leader among Swiss banks, as the "gnomes of Zurich" funded the development of their nation. After buying First Boston in the late 20th century, Credit Suisse became a bulge bracket investment bank that competed with others globally such as Goldman Sachs. The 2008 financial crisis affected Credit Suisse less than peers; while the Swiss National Bank, the central bank, rescued rival UBS after no private investor was willing to do so by purchasing $60 billion of toxic assets and $5.3 billion in shares of stock from UBS as a form of a capital infusion, Credit Suisse raised a far smaller $9 billion privately from investors to strengthen its financial position.

After the 2008 financial crisis, Credit Suisse's investment bank continued risky deals to compete with large U.S. financial institutions, while many large U.S. banks and UBS pursued more conservative strategies, and sold off riskier assets to de-risk their own portfolios.

Basel III was criticized as negatively affecting the stability of the financial system by increasing incentives for banks to game the regulatory framework. Notwithstanding the enhancement introduced by the Basel III standard, it argued that "markets often fail to discipline large banks to hold prudent capital levels and make sound investment decisions". The greater the systemic importance of a bank relative country's GDP, such as in the case of Swiss banks, the greater the likelihood of the bank taking excessive risks.

In the Swiss financial industry, the expression "It would be like UBS and Credit Suisse merging" was a joke to indicate the unlikelihood of something happening, and Swiss authorities rescued UBS because they preferred having two large banks. A UBS-Credit Suisse merger was nonetheless long rumored. Tidjane Thiam, Credit Suisse CEO from 2015 to 2020, often discussed the idea with colleagues. As Credit Suisse weakened, UBS executives planned for how to acquire its rival, and what governmental help it would need. To avoid again using public funds if a large bank needed help, Swiss authorities planned to write off its stock and bonds as needed.

=== Losses in investment banking arm ===
Credit Suisse chairman Axel Lehmann recalled at the April 2023 shareholders' meeting, after the collapse of his company, that "After the financial crisis we were named the 'Best Bank Globally'. The years since ... that is the bitter reality". Between 2008 and 2023, Credit Suisse's investment banking arm underperformed, dragging down the business's profitability and causing significant losses. The bank suffered from a series of scandals and mismanagement, including losses in its investment arm associated with the collapses of Archegos Capital and Greensill Capital in 2021. Social media rumors about the bank's demise in October 2022 aided CHF 111 billion in outflows from its wealth management business in the last three months of the year. The bank's internal control over financial reporting was flagged by its auditor, PwC, for the period 2020 to 2022.

=== March 2023 United States bank failures and contagion ===
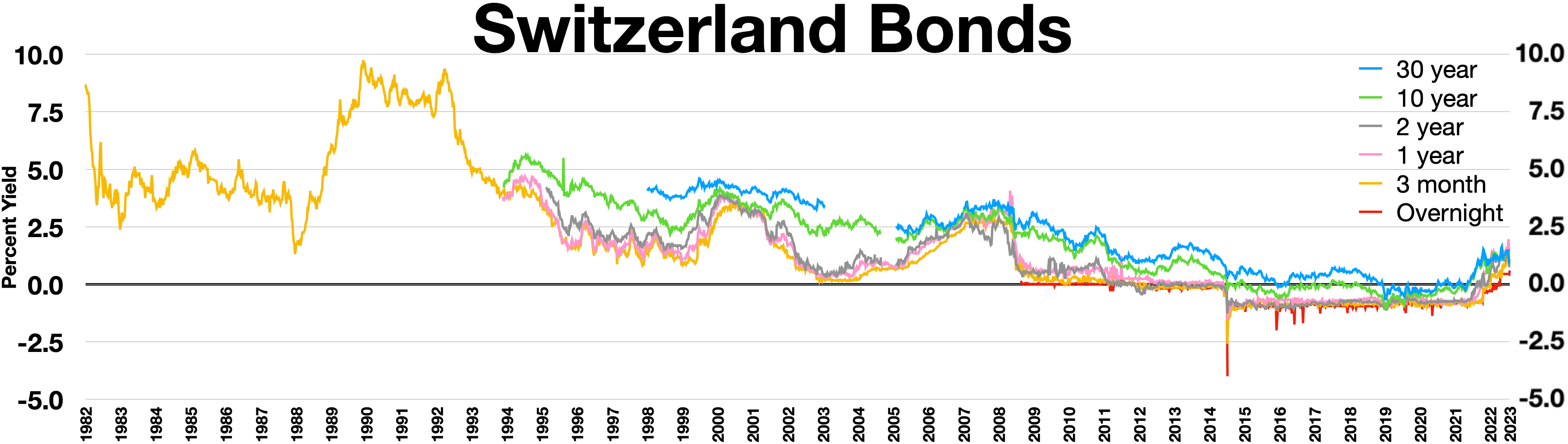
Switzerland bonds Inverted yield curve in 2023 30 year 10 year 2 year 1 year 3 month Overnight

Following the March 2023 United States bank failures, shares in the global banking sector fell sharply. The S&P Banks index declined 22% over two weeks to 18 March 2023. The U.S. bank failures caused wider concern over pressure on the sector from interest rate hikes by the Federal Reserve and other central banks.

Saudi National Bank (SNB) was Credit Suisse's largest shareholder, with almost 10%. On Wednesday, 15 March 2023, when Bloomberg Television asked SNB chairman Ammar Al Khudairy at a Riyadh conference whether his firm might further invest in Credit Suisse, he replied "The answer is absolutely not, for many reasons outside the simplest reason, which is regulatory and statutory", adding:

If we go above 10%, all new rules kick in whether it be by our regulator or the Swiss regulator or the European regulator. We're not inclined to get into a new regulatory regime. I can cite five or six other reasons, but one reason is there is a glass ceiling and we're not going to entertain going beyond it.

Bloomberg later wrote "To some Al Khudairy's comment looked like an act of self-sabotage". Although SNB later said that wanting to remain under 10% ownership was its only reason, investors panicked, akin to what happened during the 2010–2011 European debt crisis. Credit Suisse bonds fell by up to 10 cents per euro in the two hours after Al Khudairy's answer, and its stock declined up to 31% that day. Chairman Lehmann, also at the Riyadh conference, quickly returned to Zurich. Credit Suisse executives were aware that they could not control the stock price, but the bonds becoming distressed securities signaled great concern from the firm's investors and counterparties.

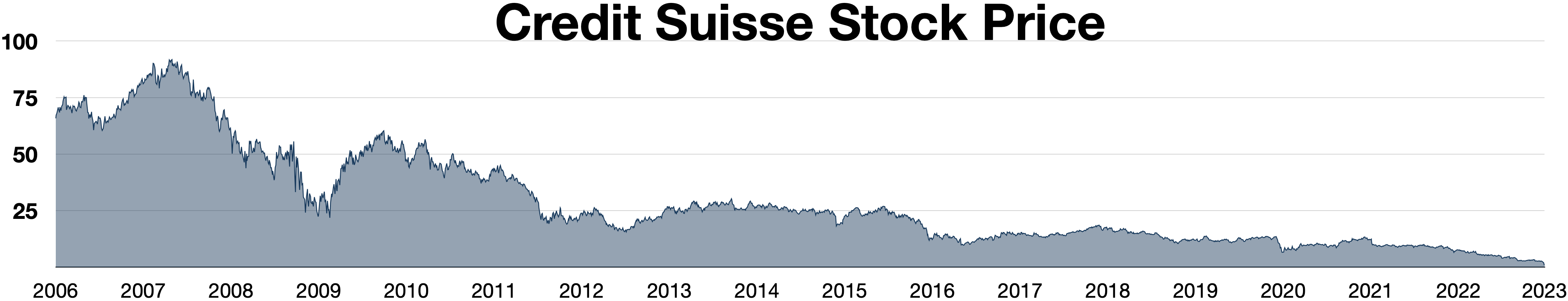
Credit Suisse stock price (2006–2023)

At 1 pm, the firm decided to buy back bonds, but needed help. Despite the existing post-2008 plan to never again use public funds to save a bank, Swiss authorities decided that they had to do so in order to avoid global panic. That day, Swiss National Bank provided to Credit Suisse a backstop in the form of an emergency line of credit of 50 billion Swiss francs ($55 billion). Despite this, daily withdrawals of demand deposits totaled over 10 billion Swiss francs later that same week. One-year credit default swaps (CDSs) for Credit Suisse rose that day from an already alarming 799 bps to 3701 bps, the highest levels for large banks since the 2008 crisis. Market discipline broke down; an investor said that the price was so high that hedging was not possible. Work at Credit Suisse almost stopped, as employees evaded clients' telephone calls and their own staff to avoid questions on the crisis.

Because of public anger at the Swiss authorities' 2008 rescue of UBS with government funding, no such rescue of Credit Suisse was possible. While publicly stating that Credit Suisse was healthy, the purpose of the backstop was to give Swiss National Bank and Swiss Financial Market Supervisory Authority (FINMA) time to find a buyer, not for the firm to save itself. They ordered UBS on Wednesday to plan an acquisition as the only alternative to nationalization of Credit Suisse, and reportedly told Credit Suisse "You will merge with UBS and announce Sunday evening before Asia opens. This is not optional". While UBS executives had feared such an order, and had to obey without fully understanding the rival's financials, they understood that Credit Suisse's collapse threatened Switzerland's financial reputation. Even Swiss diplomats discussed moving funds from the firm. Credit Suisse's one-year CDS price remained at 3468 bps on Thursday, signaling that investors doubted the central bank's reassurances. Regulators from the EU, the United States, the United Kingdom, and Switzerland expected that Credit Suisse would not have been able to open for business on 19 March had it not been bailed out or acquired by another bank. U.S. investment management company BlackRock considered acquiring parts of Credit Suisse, but dropped out on 17 March; Swiss authorities reportedly only wanted a domestic solution for the Swiss bank. The American firm decided that it did not want to anger UBS, among its larger customers.

As of April 2023, Credit Suisse has suffered net withdrawals estimated at CHF171.2 billion since October 2022. It has also been reported that while clients' withdrawals at Credit Suisse amounted to CHF65 billion in the first three month of 2023, UBS (i.e. the main competitor of Credit Suisse in Switzerland) saw CHF25 billion in new deposits/inflows ($8 billion from Swiss clients, $5 billion from East-Asia, $4 billion from the Americas and $3 billion from Europe, the Middle East and Africa). Yet, in a Bloomberg TV interview on December 2, 2022, the Chairman of Credit Suisse said that outflows "basically have stopped".

== Negotiations ==
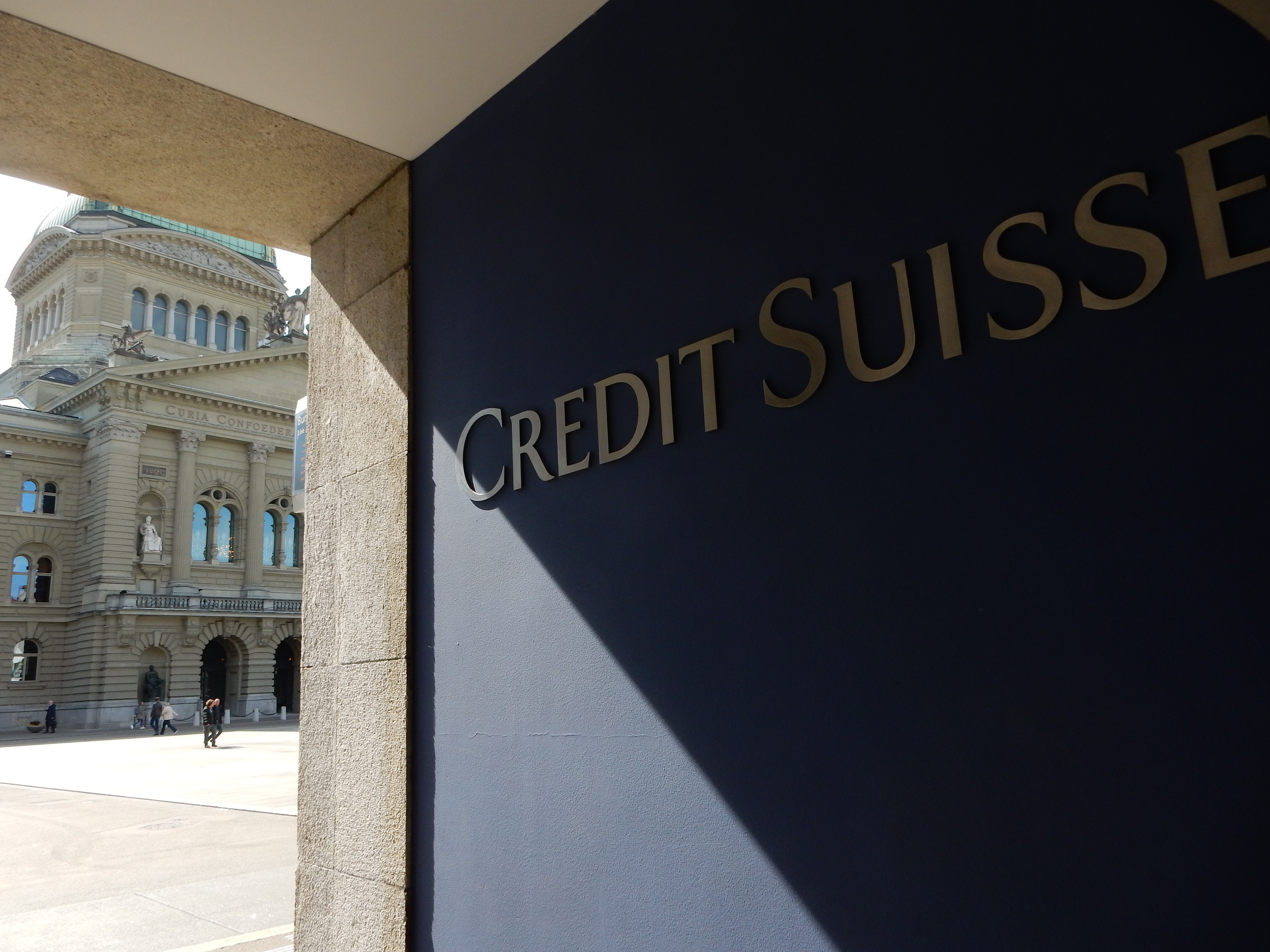
A Credit Suisse branch sited across from the Federal Palace, seat of the Swiss government, in Bern

Negotiations surrounding an acquisition began on 15 March. Swiss authorities asserted that a deal had to be done before 20 March, the following Monday, to help prevent the panic from spreading around the world. Issues discussed during the short negotiation period included UBS not wanting Credit Suisse's unprofitable investment bank, antitrust issues from combining Switzerland's two largest banks, the size of a government backstop, and whether to bypass shareholder votes. Swiss National Bank chairman Thomas Jordan led the negotiation, mostly excluding Credit Suisse management. Centerview Partners and JPMorgan advised the management teams of Credit Suisse and UBS respectively; UBS investment banker Piero Novelli and Morgan Stanley independently advised the respective boards.

Angered by their exclusion, Credit Suisse management warned UBS and Swiss authorities that its three largest shareholders—SNB part-owner Public Investment Fund, Olayan Group, and Qatar Investment Authority, together owning a quarter of the company—disliked the deal, noting that the Mideast investors were large clients of both banks. UBS only wanted Credit Suisse if the price was low, and if Swiss authorities indemnified UBS from any Credit Suisse regulatory violations. On the morning of 19 March, UBS made an offer of 0.25 Swiss francs ($0.27) per share, valuing Credit Suisse at around $1 billion, but the price outraged the Mideast investors. SNB urged Credit Suisse to reject the offer; believing that the price was too low, its board did so. The Mideast investors offered to invest $5 billion, but Swiss authorities told Lehmann that his firm had to sell to UBS. Credit Suisse contacted Deutsche Bank and others, but there was not enough time for another buyer. That afternoon, UBS countered with an offer of 0.50 Swiss francs ($0.55) per share, valuing Credit Suisse at just over $2 billion. Swiss authorities threatened to remove Credit Suisse's board if it did not accept; UBS agreed to increase its bid with increased Swiss financial support. The final deal to purchase Credit Suisse for CHF 3 billion ($3.2 billion) was accepted by the board of Credit Suisse prior to the opening of Asian financial markets on Monday morning. The acquisition was an all-stock deal, with Credit Suisse shareholders receiving 1 UBS share per 22.48 Credit Suisse shares, equivalent to CHF 0.76 per share. The price was 1% of Credit Suisse's all-time high value in 2007.

== Acquisition ==
The acquisition was coordinated by the Swiss government, led by the Federal Department of Finance, Swiss National Bank, and FINMA. In an emergency meeting on 19 March 2023, the Swiss Federal Council exercised emergency powers to allow the merger to take place without the approval of shareholders, and to provide Credit Suisse with additional liquidity assistance privileged against bankruptcy and backed by a governmental default guarantee. In addition, the Federal Council granted UBS a guarantee worth CHF 9 billion ($9.6 billion) for potential losses from risks associated with the transaction, after approval by a parliamentary committee. As part of the deal, CHF 16 billion ($17.2 billion) of AT1 bonds were written down to zero on FINMA's authorization – the largest writedown of AT1 debt so far. The move forced larger losses on bondholders than on shareholders of Credit Suisse, and was done to placate the international investors unable to vote on the acquisition.

President of Switzerland Alain Berset, Minister of Finance Karin Keller-Sutter, and Chairman Jordan announced the acquisition in a 19 March 2023 press conference, alongside the chairmen of UBS and CS. The government said that its exposure to risk was low, and considered the acquisition necessary for financial market stability in Switzerland and globally. Keller-Sutter emphasized that "This is no bailout. This is a commercial solution".

UBS Chairman Colm Kelleher stated that UBS did not initiate discussions, although he added that the company considered the transaction "financially attractive for UBS shareholders". He further added that the deal was an "emergency rescue". Tages-Anzeiger reported that Credit Suisse's Francesca McDonagh and UBS's Mike Dargan would lead their respective integration teams tasked with merging the banks. Sergio Ermotti, who served as CEO of UBS Group from 2011 to 2020, was appointed to lead the Group again, replacing Hamers on 5 April 2023. Kelleher, who was re-elected as chairman, estimated the integration to take up to four years, not including the wind-down of Credit Suisse's investment banking division.

According to Bloomberg News, UBS Group AG is likely to report a profit of as much as CHF51 billion ($57 billion) in the second-2023 quarter related to the negative goodwill generated by the acquisition of Credit Suisse. The Swiss subsidiary of Credit Suisse alone is said to be worth "multiple times" what UBS paid for it. Credit Suisse Group's book value was CHF54 billion by the end of March 2023. Later in April 2023, it was revealed the amount of "negative goodwill" would be $35 billion.

On June 9, 2023, the contract between the Swiss government and UBS was signed whereas the former agreed to pay UBS up to CHF9 billion ($9.9 billion) should the acquisition of Credit Suisse result in a loss for UBS (the first CHF5 billion will be borne by UBS itself according to the agreement).

Only two months later, on August 11, 2023, UBS announced that it ended the CHF9 billion backstop with the Swiss government as well as the CHF100 billion "liquidity backstop" with the Swiss National Bank. According to Swiss Finance Minister Karin Keller-Sutter, "Swiss taxpayers no longer bare any risk relating to the rescue of Credit Suisse". Less than one month later however, Switzerland was said to introduce a publicly guaranteed "liquidity backstop" for its banks which are "too big to fail".

=== Reactions ===
The financial market authorities of the European Union and the United States issued statements in approval of the acquisition. Analysts have described the acquisition as a "shotgun wedding" arranged by the Swiss government. Credit Suisse CEO Ulrich Körner said at the April 2023 shareholders' meeting that "We didn't succeed. We ran out of time. This fills me with sorrow".

Noting that Credit Suisse had been facing problems for several years, senior editor for CNN Business Allison Morrow stated, "[Silicon Valley Bank and Credit Suisse are] facing unrelated problems that happened to take place at the same time, worrying investors about the banking sector". Several former executives told the Financial Times that being almost unaffected by the 2008 crisis caused the 2023 collapse after years of decline, as management thought that the bank did not have to change. Two executives that observers mentioned to the newspaper as contributing to the firm's decline were Urs Rohner—chairman from 2011 to 2021, during which time Credit Suisse stock declined by 75%—and Romeo Cerutti, general counsel for 13 years until 2022.

In Swiss politics, Keller-Sutter's center-right Free Democratic Party approved of the government's intervention with regret, while the right-wing Swiss People's Party and the left-wing Social Democratic Party of Switzerland reacted with anger, denouncing "cronyism" and demanding that those responsible be held to account. Keller-Sutter said that without the acquisition, Credit Suisse "would not have survived Monday. Without a solution, payment transactions with CS in Switzerland would have been significantly disrupted, possibly even collapsed, wages and bills could no longer be paid ... We should have expected a financial crisis worldwide".

The clause of the Swiss Constitution that the government used to bypass a shareholders' vote allows emergency action "to counter existing or imminent threats of serious disruption to public order or internal or external security". Omitting the vote angered Credit Suisse's large investors; the Financial Times quoted one from the Mideast as saying "You make fun of dictatorships and then you can change the law over the weekend. What's the difference between Saudi Arabia and Switzerland now? It's really bad". CEO Vincent Kaufmann of proxy advisor Ethos Foundation, which represents up to 5% of Credit Suisse shareholders, said "This situation is a big failure of corporate governance and may send a poor image of Switzerland for international institutional investors in terms of good governance". While stating that litigation would be difficult, he disagreed with Keller-Sutter's "commercial deal" description: "If you change the law and you remove shareholders' voting power on such a key issue, then you clearly have a state intervention. It's unprecedented and an expropriation of shareholder rights". At the April 2023 Credit Suisse shareholders' meeting, Kaufmann described the firm's collapse as "a debacle without precedent". Octavio Marenzi of Opimas said "Switzerland's standing as a financial centre is shattered. The country will now be viewed as a financial banana republic". Peter V. Kunz of the University of Bern said "Foreign investors may wonder if Switzerland is a banana republic where the rule of law doesn't apply", while Kern Alexander of the University of Zurich said that the "panicked" transaction "undermined the rule of law and undermined Switzerland". At the April 2023 UBS shareholders' meeting, by contrast, there was a sense that the acquisition might be what the Financial Times called "the deal of the century", although Kelleher emphasized the transaction's difficulty. Both banks' shareholders noted that UBS's balance sheet will be larger than that of Swiss National Bank.

A March 2023-survey by gfs.bern research institute found that 54% of the Swiss disagree with the emergency rescue plan of Credit Suisse by the Swiss government. Sixty-one percent of them would have preferred the state to nationalize Credit Suisse and sell it later. Four out of five respondents want UBS to spin off Credit Suisse's Swiss operations to avoid too much risk concentration and 77% of the Swiss said they are at loggerheads with the management of Credit Suisse over the debacle.

In April 2023, the Swiss Attorney General's office opened an investigation to analyze and identify whether any criminal offenses by the government officials, regulators and executives at the two banks, had occurred in connection with the acquisition. The results of the investigation will be sealed for 50 years, longer than the typical 30 for such inquiries.

==== AT1 bonds issue ====
Analysts warned that UBS-Credit Suisse deal could extend rather than end the banking crisis, mainly because of the write-off of AT1 bonds worth CHF 16 billion. AJ Bell investment director Russ Mould said: "It means the banking crisis we've seen over the past few weeks has started a new chapter rather than reaching its ending". AT1 bonds from Credit Suisse and UBS are unusual in their terms allowing for total write-off instead of conversion to equity; most such securities have more protections. Both the Bank of England (BoE) and European authorities stated on 20 March that equity would remain subordinated to debt. According to BoE, "clear statutory order" existed for bank resolutions, in that which AT1 holders would be exposed to losses after equity investors. Former European Central Bank (ECB) vice president Vítor Constâncio said that the Swiss AT1 decision was a "mistake with consequences and potentially a host of court cases", and Jacob Kirkegaard of the Peterson Institute said "A lot of lawsuits will be coming from this, which will highlight the erratic and selfish behavior of Swiss authorities in this saga". As of 21 March 2023 the AT1 bonds traded for a few cents on the dollar, implying that investors still see value in them through litigation.

Swiss financial regulator FINMA has however stated that the write down "complied with contractual obligations". Moreover, these bonds provide that they will be completely written down in a "Viability Event", in particular if extraordinary government support is granted.

Despite having similar terms to Credit Suisse's AT1 bonds, its $2.5 billion in Tier 2 bonds were not written off. FT Alphaville wrote "The best/funniest argument we've heard is that they just forgot about this issue, and by the time someone realised it was best to just pretend this was all deliberate".

On 14 October 2025, the Federal Administrative Court of Switzerland ruled that the write-off of AT1 bonds was unlawful.

==== Sale price issue ====
Because the emergency takeover on March 19 reduced the value of individual Credit Suisse shares from CHF1.86 on March 17 to CHF0.76 two days later, when the agreement was reached, shareholders claim in court that the bank should have been sold at much higher price (anywhere between CHF7.3 billion to CHF35 billion).

==== Lawsuits ====
As of October 2023, there were $9 billion worth of claims pending in US and Swiss courts, mostly relating to the AT1 bonds write-off issue. Regarding the claims in international arbitration, Dr. iur. Alexander Lindemann, Founder of Zurich-based Lindemannlaw firm, observed: "Due to the more than 110 [Swiss bilateral] investment protection agreements and the five-year limitation period in [the Swiss] expropriation law, arbitration courts will be dealing with this issue until at least 2028."

== Impact ==
UBS's Kelleher said that the deal would take a few weeks to close, and that UBS intends to engage in "de-risking" the "tricky businesses" run by Credit Suisse. He said that Credit Suisse would continue to operate as normal until the closing of the merger, and that nothing could yet be said about the merger's impact on Credit Suisse's employees. As part of the deal, UBS will wind down Credit Suisse's investment bank.

Credit Suisse's largest shareholders, including SNB (9.9% stake) and sovereign wealth funds Qatar Investment Authority (6.8% stake) and Norges Bank Investment Management, are expected to take significant losses from the acquisition.

Other Swiss banks hoped to replace Credit Suisse as the country's second-largest. Zurich Cantonal Bank CEO Urs Baumann said that his firm "offers all business areas of a universal bank and is thus a complement to the newly emerging big bank". The stock of Julius Baer Group, which became the country's second-largest bank by assets after Credit Suisse's collapse, rose by 13% during the week after the UBS acquisition.

The takeover resulted in $17 billion of Credit Suisse-issued AT1 bonds being written off as worthless, which undermined the creditworthiness of the newly acquired bank. Property rights have also been described by shareholders as weakened in Switzerland because the transaction bypassed any shareholders' statutory approval. A bond selloff resulting from AT1 bond wipeout prompted UBS to buy back €2.75 billion worth of bonds that it issued days prior to the acquisition announcement, compensating its investors in a bid to stabilize the markets.

Bank of America asked its traders and hedge fund clients to stop dispatching trades to Credit Suisse's dark pools as a precautionary measure following the acquisition, according to Reuters.

According to BAK Economics, a Swiss economic research and consulting institute, 9,500 to 12,000 jobs are threatened in Switzerland, with job losses in Zurich estimated at between 6,500 and 8,000 FTEs. The acquisition will most likely affect mid- and back-office operational jobs, plus legal, compliance, marketing, human resources, and regional positions; some UBS and Credit Suisse bank branches are next to each other. Although UBS employees are likely safer, Credit Suisse was stronger in some areas, such as domestic corporate banking. UBS will be less likely to raise salaries because employees can no longer leave for Credit Suisse. According to Tages-Anzeiger, the job cuts are expected to affect 20–30 percent of the combined workforce, or up to 30,000 jobs. In August 2023, UBS declared that job losses in Switzerland would be 3,000 moving forward (UBS reported that 8,000 employees at CS have already left since 2023).

Based on state guarantees, if there were a bankruptcy of the merged entity, every person in Switzerland would be liable for up to CHF 12,500 ($13,500).

SNB's Al Khudairy resigned a week after the acquisition, citing personal reasons. A banker in Saudi Arabia told the Financial Times that "The issue of the chairman's statement did not go unnoticed amongst the senior decision makers". Another said that he "was a victim of giving his honest opinion at such a tense time for Credit Suisse. In hindsight ... his answer was the right course of action".

According to the SonntagsZeitung, "a handful of Credit Suisse executives were handed hundreds of millions of francs in opaque profit-sharing deals in the years leading up to the bank's collapse". It was also reported that Brady Dougan, Credit Suisse's former CEO, earned CHF71 million in bonuses after the 2008 financial crisis which saw the bank's shares plummet. Swiss Parliament is also considering reforms that would curb excessive bonuses for banks that are deemed "too big to fail".

On June 14, 2023, Switzerland formed a parliamentary commission to probe the collapse of Credit Suisse. In December 2024, the commission said CS had mismanaged its finances which led to its collapse, but found no mistake by the Swiss authorities themselves, in its report (but many "shortcomings", including by the Swiss National Bank and FINMA). In 2025, the Swiss government proposed to increase the capital requirement for UBS. Namely, by requiring 100% capital backing for its subsidiaries abroad. These new measures still need to be approved by the Swiss parliament and are subject to referendum.

According to Citigroup, the new bank will account for 35% of domestic deposits, 31% of corporate loans and 26% of mortgages in Switzerland. UBS will keep the Swiss business of Credit Suisse but will retire its brand. UBS says it plans to cut costs by $10 billion. UBS also announced at the end of August 2023 that money outflows have stopped at Credit Suisse. UBS announced a record profit of nearly $30 billion in the second quarter of 2023 following the acquisition of Credit Suisse.

== See also ==
- Banking in Switzerland
