= BCO =

BCO may refer to:

- Baco Airport, an airport in Ethiopia.
- BioCompute Object, a type of computational file built using the BioCompute standard for communicating workflows in high throughput sequencing analysis.
- Baseball Confederation of Oceania, the governing body for baseball in Oceania.
- Binary-coded octal, binary-encoded octal code
- Biodiversity Convention Office, a Canadian government office on biodiversity.
- Cash Offer, an all-cash non-contingent real estate offer.
- Boulder, Colorado
