= Additional Tier 1 =

- Bank regulatory capital
- Claim order. AT1 ranks below Tier 2 and above common equity, and with common equity it forms Tier 1.
- Other names: AT1; AT1 bond; AT1 instrument
- Framework: Basel III
- Published: December 2010
- Component of: Tier 1 capital, with Common Equity Tier 1
- Role: Going-concern loss absorption
- Form: Perpetual, subordinated, unsecured
- Coupons: Discretionary and non-cumulative
- Ordinary call: After five years, with supervisory approval
- Loss absorption: Conversion into ordinary shares, or write-down
- CET1 trigger: At least 5.125%, if the instrument is a liability
- Point of non-viability: Permanent write-off or conversion
- Use in minimum ratios: Up to 1.5 pp of the 6% Tier 1 minimum; also counts in total capital

In finance, Additional Tier 1 capital (AT1) is a category of regulatory capital for banks under Basel III. With Common Equity Tier 1 (CET1)—mainly ordinary shares and retained profits—it forms Tier 1 capital, which Basel treats as going-concern capital: it absorbs losses while the bank is still open. Tier 2 capital is gone-concern capital, for losses after failure. AT1 must also be permanently written off, or converted into ordinary shares, if the authorities judge that the bank can no longer carry on; non-viability.

Securities that meet the tests are usually called AT1 bonds or AT1 instruments. They must be paid in, perpetual, unsecured and junior to depositors, ordinary creditors and other subordinated debt, including Tier 2. The bank must be free to cancel coupons. If the accounts treat the instrument as a liability, its terms must convert it into ordinary shares, or write it down, at a pre-specified CET1 trigger. Accounting standards may still record the same instrument as equity or as a liability.

== Regulatory criteria ==
The Basel Committee on Banking Supervision published the capital definition on 16 December 2010, after the 2008 financial crisis had shown that some capital did not reliably absorb losses. In January 2011 it required AT1 and Tier 2 to be written off or converted at the point of non-viability. The standards were phased in from 2013.

To count as AT1, the instrument must be paid in, unsecured, and junior to depositors, general creditors and other subordinated debt. It must have no maturity date and no coupon step-up or other incentive to redeem.

An ordinary call is allowed only after five years, with prior supervisory approval. The bank must not create an expectation that the call will be exercised. It may call only if it replaces the instrument with capital of the same or better quality, on terms its earnings can support, or if capital will remain well above the minimum after the call. A tax or regulatory call inside five years is allowed if the supervisor accepts that the bank could not have foreseen the change at issuance.

The bank must be able to cancel coupons at any time. Cancellation is not a default, missed payments do not accrue, and payments may be made only from distributable items. Cancelled amounts stay in the bank. A holder can therefore lose while the bank is still open if the coupon is cancelled, if the instrument is never called, or if the principal is written down or converted.

=== Loss absorption ===
If the instrument is a liability, its terms must convert it into ordinary shares, or write down the principal, at an objective pre-specified CET1 trigger of at least 5.125%. CET1 is measured as a percentage of risk-weighted assets. A higher trigger is allowed. The amount converted or written down must restore the CET1 ratio to the trigger, or take the full principal if that is not possible. A temporary write-down can meet this test. The mechanism must create CET1, and the instrument counts as AT1 only up to that amount. Equity-accounted AT1 does not need this trigger.

Separately, every AT1 and Tier 2 instrument must be capable of permanent write-off or conversion at the point of non-viability. The trigger is the earlier of an authority's decision that this is needed to avoid non-viability, and a decision to inject public capital, or equivalent support, without which the bank would become non-viable. The rule may be contractual or statutory.

A write-down cancels what the bank owes the holder and leaves that value with shareholders. Conversion dilutes shareholders. Either can happen before insolvency. In a winding-up without that step, Basel's subordination rule puts AT1 behind other subordinated debt, including Tier 2, and ordinary shareholders last. National law sets the exact order. A contractual trigger based on an authority's judgment, rather than on the CET1 ratio, can still wipe out AT1 while shares retain some value. The Financial Stability Institute has found that this is possible in Switzerland, Japan and China, but not, outside resolution, in the European Union or the United Kingdom.

== Place in the capital requirements ==
Basel III minima as a share of risk-weighted assets.

Basel III requires CET1 of at least 4.5% of risk-weighted assets, Tier 1 of at least 6%, and total capital of at least 8%. AT1 can supply the 1.5-point gap in the Tier 1 minimum. Further AT1 still counts, with Tier 2, toward the 8% total. It also counts in the leverage ratio, whose capital measure is Tier 1.

The capital conservation buffer of 2.5%, the countercyclical buffer and the buffers for systemically important banks sit above the minimum and must be CET1. AT1 cannot fill them.

== Contingent convertible bonds ==
A contingent convertible bond (CoCo) is written down or converted into equity when a stated capital trigger is hit. AT1 is a regulatory category, so the names are not interchangeable. A CoCo counts as AT1 only if it meets the tests above; a dated CoCo may qualify as Tier 2. Issuance has been driven largely by eligibility as regulatory capital. Spreads depend on the trigger level and on whether losses are taken by conversion or by write-down.

== Credit Suisse ==
On 19 March 2023, as UBS agreed to take over Credit Suisse, the Swiss Financial Market Supervisory Authority (FINMA) ordered a complete write-down of Credit Suisse AT1. FINMA put the nominal amount at about CHF 16 billion; the Swiss Federal Administrative Court later put it at about CHF 16.5 billion. Tier 2 was not written down.

FINMA relied on two separate grounds: a contractual "viability event", which it said was met because Credit Suisse received extraordinary liquidity loans backed by a federal default guarantee, and an emergency ordinance, made the same day, that authorised a write-down. The CET1 capital trigger was not breached.

Credit Suisse shareholders received one UBS share for every 22.48 Credit Suisse shares, about CHF 3 billion in all. AT1 was written down to zero. Because the bonds absorbed losses by write-down rather than conversion, the Financial Stability Institute described a transfer of value from AT1 holders to shareholders.

On 20 March 2023, ECB Banking Supervision, the Single Resolution Board and the European Banking Authority said that in the European Union ordinary shares absorb losses first, and AT1 is written down only after those shares have been fully used. The Bank of England stated the same order for the United Kingdom.

About 3,000 complainants challenged the decree in about 360 cases. On 1 October 2025 the Federal Administrative Court, in a partial decision in a lead case, revoked the decree. It held that the contractual viability event had not occurred: Credit Suisse still met its capital requirements, and the official support was liquidity support. It also held that there was no sufficient statutory basis and, on a preliminary review, that the emergency-ordinance provision was unconstitutional. It did not decide whether the write-down should be reversed.

FINMA said the judgment was not final and that it would appeal to the Federal Supreme Court. FINMA and UBS appealed. On 10 December 2025 the Federal Supreme Court gave the appeal suspensive effect, so the write-down remained in force pending its decision.

== See also ==
- Basel III
- Common Equity Tier 1
- Tier 2 capital
- Contingent convertible bond
- Capital requirement
- Bail-in
