= Contingent convertible bond =

Type of financial instrument

A contingent convertible bond (CoCo), also known as an enhanced capital note (ECN), is a fixed-income instrument that is convertible into equity if a pre-specified trigger event occurs. The concept of CoCo has been particularly discussed in the context of crisis management in the banking industry. It has been also emerging as an alternative way for keeping solvency in the insurance industry.

== Concept ==
The concept of "No Fault Default" was proposed by Professor Robert Merton in 1990 as a guarantee that gives holders "contractual right to seize the firm's assets (or its equity interest) whenever the value of assets is below the value of its guaranteed debt." The specific idea of "Contingent Convertible Bonds" as an avoidance mechanism for financial distress was proposed by an Olin Fellow at the Harvard Law School, and published in the Harvard Law Review in 1991. These concepts may have served as inspiration to the instrument used during the 2008 financial crisis.

== The trigger and the loss absorption ==
A contingent convertible bond is defined by two elements: a trigger activation and a loss-absorption mechanism. The trigger activation is the pre-specified event that causes the loss-absorption process. It can be either based on a mechanical rule or on supervisors' discretion. The loss-absorption mechanism consists either of conversion into a pre-specified amount of equity or of writing-down the nominal value of the coco bond. The trigger, which can be bank specific, systemic, or dual, has to be defined in a way ensuring automatic and inviolable conversion. A possibility of a dynamic sequence exists—conversion occurs at different pre-specified thresholds of the trigger event. Since the trigger can be subject to accounting or market manipulation, a commonly used measure has been the market's measure of bank's solvency. The design of the trigger and the conversion rate are critical in the instrument's effectiveness.

== Forms ==
Contingent convertible bonds can take a variety of different forms such as a standby loan, a catastrophe bond, a surplus note, or a call option enhanced reverse convertible.

== Pricing ==
Pricing contingent convertible bonds is challenging, especially because of several regulatory aspects that have to be taken into account. The relevant regulatory framework for CoCos is set out in the fourth European Capital Requirement Directive (CRD IV), the Capital Requirements Regulation (CRR) and the Bank Recovery and Resolution Directive (BRRD) regulatory accords. In empirical terms, the following variables have been shown to have an influence on the spreads of contingent convertibles (sign of the effect in parentheses): the bank's Tier 1 capital ratio (+), the issuing bank is a globally systemically important financial institution, i.e., a systemically important bank (G-SIB) (-), the issuer is headquartered in a Southern European country (+), having an equity-conversion vs. a permanent write down as loss-absorption mechanism (-), having a low-trigger vs. a high-trigger (-), the bank's credit default swap (CDS) spread (+), the bank's past stock returns (+), and the bank's stock-return volatility (+). Further, with respect to regulatory variables, also the distance‐to‐maximum distributable amount (MDA)‐threshold has been shown to have a negative, economically relevant, and statistically significant influence on CoCo spreads.

== Advantages and criticism ==
In the context of crisis management, contingent convertible bonds have been particularly acknowledged for their potential to prevent systematic collapse of important financial institutions. If the conversion occurs promptly, a bankruptcy can be entirely prevented due to quick injection of capital which would be impossible to be obtained otherwise, either because of the market or the so-called recapitalization gridlock. In addition, due to its debt nature, a contingent convertible bond constitutes a tax shield before conversion. Hence, as compared to common equity, the cost of capital and, consequently, the cost of maintaining a risk absorbing facility are lower. In case the trigger event occurs, conversion of debt into equity drives down company's leverage.

Also, contingent debt is said to have the potential to control the principal-agent problem in a two way manner—engaging both the shareholders and the managers. The greater market discipline and more stringent corporate governance are exercised as a result of shareholders’ direct risk of stock dilution in case conversion was triggered. An argument has been made that making managers’ bonuses in a form of contingent convertible debt instruments could reduce their behavior of excessive risk taking caused by their striving to provide investors with the desired return on equity.

A critical benefit of contingent convertible debt that distinguishes it from other forms of risk absorbing debt is the effect of "going concern conversion". When the trigger is well chosen, automatic conversion reduces leverages precisely when the bank faces high incentives for risk shifting. Accordingly, this feature ensures a preventive effect on endogenous risk creation, unlike any other form of bank debt. On the other hand, contingent capital in a form of convertible bonds remains a largely untested instrument causing fears as to its effects especially during periods of high market volatility and uncertainty. The appropriate specification of the trigger and the conversion rate is critical to the instrument's effectiveness. Some argue that conversion could produce negative signaling effects leading to potential financial contagion and price manipulation. Lastly, the instrument's marketability remains doubtful.

== Credit Suisse AT1s ==
When the acquisition of Credit Suisse by UBS was announced on 19 March 2023, the Swiss Financial Market Supervisory Authority stated that CHF 16 billion (US$17 billion) of Credit Suisse Additional Tier 1 (AT1) bonds would be written down to zero. Only AT1 bonds issued by the two Swiss banks allow for such in their terms; most such securities have more protections. The Single Resolution Board, the European Banking Authority, and the ECB Banking Supervision to release a joint statement confirming that, under the EU resolution framework, AT1 instruments cannot be written down before the full use of CET instruments to absorb losses. An expert from Swiss Lindemannlaw firm representing individuals and legal entities who suffered damages from writing down of the Credit Suisse AT1 bonds, indicated they have a 5-year term (until 2028) to initiate arbitration proceedings due to the provisions of the Swiss expropriation law. On 14 October 2025, the Federal Administrative Court of Switzerland ruled that the write-off of AT1 bonds was unlawful.

== See also ==
- Convertible bond
- Risk management
- Capital structure
- Contingent claim valuation
- Additional Tier 1 (AT1)
