= Capital adequacy ratio =

Ratio of a bank's capital to its risk

Capital adequacy ratio (CAR), also known as capital to risk (weighted) assets ratio (CRAR), is the ratio of a bank's capital to its risk-weighted assets (or credit exposure). National regulators track a bank's CAR and ensure it complies with statutory capital requirements to verify it can absorb a reasonable amount of loss (default of loans) without collapsing. The enforcement of regulated levels of this CAR is intended to protect depositors and promote stability and efficiency of financial systems around the world.

== Formula ==
Capital adequacy ratios (CARs) are a measure of the amount of a bank's core capital expressed as a percentage of its risk-weighted asset.

Two types of capital are measured:

- Tier 1 capital, which can absorb losses without a bank being required to cease trading; and
- Tier 2 capital, which can absorb losses in the event of a winding-up and so provides a lesser degree of protection to depositors.

Tier 1 capital (T1) = (paid up capital + statutory reserves + disclosed free reserves) - (equity investments in subsidiary + intangible assets + current & brought-forward losses)

Tier 2 capital (T2) = A) Undisclosed Reserves + B) General Loss reserves + C) hybrid debt capital instruments and subordinated debts

Capital adequacy ratio is defined as:

$\mbox{CAR} = \cfrac{\mbox{Tier 1 capital + Tier 2 capital}}{\mbox{Risk weighted assets}}$

Risk can either be weighted assets or the respective national regulator's minimum total capital requirement. If using risk weighted assets, CAR should be

$\mbox{CAR} = \cfrac{T_1 + T_2}{a}$ ≥ 10%.

The percent threshold varies from bank to bank (10% in this case, a common requirement for regulators conforming to Basel III) and is set by the national banking regulator of different countries.

== Use ==
Capital adequacy ratio is the ratio which determines the bank's capacity to meet the time liabilities and other risks such as credit risk, operational risk etc. In the most simple formulation, a bank's capital is the "cushion" for potential losses, and protects the bank's depositors and other lenders. Banking regulators in most countries define and monitor CAR to protect depositors, thereby maintaining confidence in the banking system.

CAR is similar to leverage; in the most basic formulation, it is comparable to the inverse of debt-to-equity leverage formulations (although CAR uses equity over assets instead of debt-to-equity; since assets are by definition equal to debt plus equity, a transformation is required). Unlike traditional leverage, however, CAR recognizes that assets can have different levels of risk.

== Risk weighting ==
Since different types of assets have different risk profiles, CAR primarily adjusts for assets that are less risky by allowing banks to "discount" lower-risk assets. The specifics of CAR calculation vary from country to country, but general approaches tend to be similar for countries that have applied Basel III. In the most basic application, government debt is allowed a 0% "risk weighting" - that is, they are subtracted from total assets for purposes of calculating the CAR.

=== Risk weighting example ===
Risk weighted assets - Fund Based: Risk weighted assets mean fund based assets such as cash, loans, investments and other assets. Degrees of credit risk expressed as percentage weights have been assigned by the national regulator to each such assets.

Non-funded (Off-Balance sheet) Items: The credit risk exposure attached to off-balance sheet items has to be first calculated by multiplying the face amount of each of the off-balance sheet items by the Credit Conversion Factor. This will then have to be again multiplied by the relevant weightage.

Local regulations establish that cash and government bonds have a 0% risk weighting, and residential mortgage loans have a 50% risk weighting. All other types of assets (loans to customers) have a 100% risk weighting.

=== Example ===
Suppose that bank "A" has 80 units of Tier 1 capital and 20 units of Tier 2 capital. It total capital is therefore, 100 units.

Bank "A" has assets totaling 1000 units, consisting of:

- Government bonds: 200 units
- Mortgage loans: 500 units
- Other loans: 750 units

Bank A's risk-weighted assets are calculated as follows

Government bonds	$200 * 0\% = 0$
Mortgage loans	$500 * 50\% = 250$
Other loans	$750 * 100\% = 750$
Total risk
Capital	100
Risk Weighted Assets	1000
CAR (Capital/RWA)	10%

The bank has outstanding loans (or assets) of 1450 units or capital to assets ratio of approximately 6.9%. Nevertheless, some of these loans are completely riskless (government bonds), while others are riskier (other loans). Therefore, adjusting for risk, the bank has outstanding loans of 1000 units, or a CAR of 10%.

== Types of capital ==
Basel III recognizes that different types of equity are more important than others. To recognize this, different adjustments are made:

1. Tier I Capital: Actual contributed equity plus retained earnings...
2. Tier II Capital: Preferred shares plus 50% of subordinated debt...

Different minimum CARs are applied. For example, the minimum Tier I equity allowed by statute for risk-weighted assets may be 6%, while the minimum CAR when including Tier 2 capital may be 8%.

There is usually a maximum of Tier 2 capital that may be "counted" towards CAR, which varies by jurisdiction.

== See also ==
- Capital requirement
  - Capital requirement § Common capital ratios
- TLAC, Total Loss Absorbency Capacity
- LR, Leverage Ratio
- NSFR, Net Stable Funding Ratio
- LCR, Liquidity Coverage Ratio
