= CRAR =

CRAR may refer to:

- The Capital to Risk (Weighted) Assets Ratio, a form of capital adequacy ratio
- The statutory Commercial Rent Arrears Recovery process used in the United Kingdom
