= Biodiversity Convention Office =

Canadian governmental organization

Canada's Biodiversity Convention Office (BCO) serves as the National Focal Point for the United Nations Convention on Biological Diversity and the Canadian Biodiversity Strategy. BCO also provides a leadership role in the Biodiversity Conservation Working Group of the Commission for Environmental Cooperation and in the Conservation of Arctic Flora and Fauna (CAFF) working group of the Arctic Council.

The BCO was established by Environment Canada in September 1991 to coordinate Canadian involvement in the negotiations of the convention. Following Canada's ratification of the Convention in December 1992, attention shifted to development of a Canadian response. Under the guidance of the BCO, a Federal-Provincial-Territorial Working Group was charged by the Canadian Council of Ministers of the Environment with developing the Canadian Biodiversity Strategy. In 1996, all jurisdictions signed a statement of commitment to use the Strategy as a guide to implementing the Convention in Canada. In 2005, Ministers instructed the Federal-Provincial-Territorial Working Group to develop a corresponding outcomes-based framework for guiding and monitoring implementation of the Canadian Biodiversity Strategy. This Biodiversity Outcomes Framework was approved by Ministers responsible for Environment, Forests, Parks, Fisheries and Aquaculture, and Wildlife in October 2006.

The BCO plays a policy coordinating, catalysing and facilitating role in national efforts to define Canada's response to the Convention and National Strategy. It operates through a network of contacts within and outside government. At the federal level, an Interdepartmental Committee on Biodiversity provides advice and guidance on domestic and international policy issues. The Federal/Provincial/Territorial Biodiversity Working Group focuses on national biodiversity issues. BCO also works with indigenous groups to enable their participation in meeting the objectives of the Convention and the Canadian Biodiversity Strategy. It also undertakes a variety of public education activities, helping to create awareness and training tools for national implementation of the Canadian Biodiversity Strategy.

See also: Criticisms of the biodiversity paradigm
