= MyRichUncle =

Loan product

- Type: Defunct
- Industry: Student loans
- Founded: March 2000; 26 years ago
- Founders: Vishal Garg; Raza Khan
- Defunct: February 9, 2009; 17 years ago
- Fate: Filed for Chapter 7 bankruptcy

MyRichUncle, owned by MRU Holdings, Inc., offered discounted student loans to borrowers in the United States.

In 2001, the company launched its first product, in which students signed over a percentage of future earnings to investors; selling their human capital.

In 2006, MyRichUncle published an advertisement in The New York Times questioning financial aid administrators' practice of taking "kickbacks" from lenders in exchange for a place on their "preferred lender" lists; the campaign triggered an investigation that led to several lenders agreeing to a new code of conduct. The campaign also alienated many school administrators.

Between May 2005, when the company launched a private loan product, through June 2008, the company originated over $420 million of private student loans and approximately $40 million of federal student loans.

The company depended on Merrill Lynch to buy and securitize its loans. In February 2009, after banks cut off the company's credit lines due to the 2008 financial crisis, MRU Holdings filed for Chapter 7 bankruptcy and suspended its operations.

== History ==
MyRichUncle's co-founders, Raza Khan and Vishal Garg, met at Stuyvesant High School in New York City and attended New York University together. The founders were inspired by smart classmates who only applied to colleges that they could afford. Garg and Khan founded Iempower in 1999.

In 2001, the company launched its first product, in which students signed over a percentage of future earnings to investors; selling their human capital. Students usually received between $5,000 and $10,000 per semester, and had to pay back 0.5% to 4% of their earnings for ten to fifteen years. However, the product only served a small niche market.

To decide how to allocate investor financing to students and at what rates, Iempower built a proprietary data model that used historical data going as far back as the 1960s to predict a student's future income and career prospects based upon a variety of academic and credit factors.

In 2001, the company partnered with the Robertson Education Empowerment Foundation to provide $3 million in financial aid to students.

The company's offices on the 78th floor of 1 World Trade Center were destroyed in the September 11 attacks. The company then moved to Midtown Manhattan.

MyRichUncle then entered the private student loan industry. In July 2004, Iempower, with an equity capital raise of $4.2 million, completed a reverse public merger with Pacific Technologies. Iempower Inc. then changed its name to MRU Holdings, Inc.

In February 2005, MRU Holdings obtained a $165 million credit facility, expandable to $300 million, for funding private student loans from a subsidiary of Nomura Holdings.

In May 2005, it began offering private student loans under the brand name MyRichUncle.

In January 2006, MRU Holdings obtained a $175 million credit facility with Merrill Lynch. The company also raised funds by selling Series B convertible stock.

In May 2006, MRU introduced its PrePrime product.

In June 2006, MyRichUncle introduced its federal loan program.

In July 2004, the company's stock began trading on the OTC Bulletin Board and in October 2006, the it began trading on the Nasdaq.

In February 2007, MRU Holdings purchased Embark, which provided online admissions applications and enrollment management services to colleges and universities and other institutions, from The Princeton Review.

The company also partnered with STA Travel to provide travel loans for study abroad students.

In April 2007, MRU Holdings announced an exclusive marketing partnership with The Princeton Review.

In June 2007, MRU Holdings closed its first securitization transaction, issuing $200 million in principal amount of asset-backed securities through Merrill Lynch & Co.

In July 2008, despite market turbulence due to the 2008 financial crisis, MRU Holdings closed its second securitization, issuing $140 million in asset-backed securities through Merrill Lynch, Goldman Sachs & Co. and BB&T Capital Markets.

Between May 2005, when the company launched a private loan product, through June 2008, the company originated over $420 million of private student loans and approximately $40 million of federal student loans.

In 2006, MyRichUncle published an advertisement in The New York Times questioning financial aid administrators' practice of taking "kickbacks" from lenders in exchange for a place on their "preferred lender" lists; the campaign triggered an investigation that led to several lenders agreeing to a new code of conduct. The campaign also alienated many school administrators.

The company depended on Merrill Lynch to buy and securitize its loans. In February 2009, after banks cut off the company's credit lines due to the 2008 financial crisis, MRU Holdings filed for Chapter 7 bankruptcy and suspended its operations.

== Awards and recognition ==
- Ranked 16th among the "Fast 50" by Fast Company in 2006.
- MyRichUncle is featured in Footing The Tuition Bill: The New Student Loan Sector, edited by Frederick M. Hess, and the college textbook Marketing: Real People, Real Choices (5th edition) by Michael R. Solomon, Greg Marshall, and Elnora Stuart.
