= Canadian Biodiversity Information Network =

== History ==
Canada began to develop the Canadian Biodiversity Information Network (CBIN) in 1996 as an internet based resource centre to serve as Canada's national node to the global Clearing House Mechanism. Canada's first national report to the convention stated that CBIN was to become operational in the same year. In recent years, researchers have continued to underscore the gap in translating knowledge in biodiversity topics into conservation action.

== Role and functions ==
Canada's third national report to the Convention on Biological Diversity described CBIN stated that the site covered developments under the convention and information on implementing the Canadian Biodiversity Strategy, and that it provided access to biodiversity related information from academia, industry, non-governmental organizations, and governments.

The Canadian Biodiversity Information Facility (CBIF), administered by Agriculture and Agri-Food Canada, served as Canada's national counterpart to the Global Biodiversity Information Facility (GBIF), providing tools such as the Integrated Taxonomic Information System (ITIS), the Species Access Network, and SpeciesBank. CBIF operated as a data repository from 2001 until it was decommissioned on December 20, 2021.

== Outreach ==
Environment Canada used CBIN as a public outreach platform during the 2010 International Year of Biodiversity, where it turned into a virtual meeting place where Canadians were able to share stories about how they were celebrating the year.

See also: Criticisms of the biodiversity paradigm
