= Canadian Biodiversity Strategy =

The Canadian Biodiversity Strategy has been prepared in response to Canada's obligations as a party to the United Nations Convention on Biological Diversity. The Strategy has been developed as a guide to the implementation of the Biodiversity Convention in Canada.

Recognition of the worldwide impact of the decline of biodiversity inspired the global community to negotiate the United Nations Convention on Biological Diversity. The Canadian delegation participated in the negotiations, the Prime Minister signed the Convention at the Earth Summit in June 1992 and, in December 1992, Canada ratified it. Prior ratifying parties included Mauritius, Maldives, and Monaco.

One of the key obligations for parties that have ratified the Convention is to prepare a national strategy.

== Development and status ==
The Canadian Biodiversity Strategy was developed together by the federal, provincial and territorial governments and then released in 1995 and consequently, all Canadian jurisdictions signed a statement of commitment to use it as a lead. The Convention on Biological Diversity's Canada profile describes this as an highlighting importance of Canada's natural assets and setting out strategic directions for the conservation and sustainable use of Canada's natural resources.

== Elements of the strategy ==
The Strategy contains guiding principles supporting a vision of society that lives sustainably, and contains a framework for action to support sustainable development as part of international efforts to implement the Convention on Biological Diversity. The Strategy goals are related to conservation, education, support, and collaboration. In 2005, the federal, provincial and territorial ministers instructed a working group to develop an outcomes-based framework in order to implement the Strategy, and the Biodiversity Outcomes Framework was approved in the following year.

In 2015, Canada adopted 19 targets to fulfill its obligations under the treaty. The first was to conserve at least 17% of terrestrial area and inland water, and 10% of coastal and marine areas, through "networks of protected areas and other effective area-based conservation measures." By the end of 2019, Canada was not on track to meeting its first target, having only conserved 12.1% of its terrestrial area (land and freshwater).

The Canadian Biodiversity Strategy was later complemented by the Biodiversity Outcomes Framework for Canada, which pursued to identify and connect current and future biodiversity priorities, engage Canadians in the planning and implementation, and to report on future progress. Federal, provincial and territorial governments have taken this Strategy as a blueprint and have developed their own biodiversity strategies in order to implement conservation and sustainable use of resources found in Canada.

== 2030 Nature Strategy ==
In June of 2024, the Government of Canada released a national framework called Canada's 2030 Nature Strategy to implement the Kunming-Montreal Global Biodiversity Framework, which had been adopted in 2022 by Canada and 195 other countries. This strategy sets out a roadmap to halt and reverse the loss of biodiversity in Canada by building on the earlier Canadian biodiversity policy instruments and to address all of the 23 targets that were set by the global framework. The Canadian government stated that the strategy includes federal implementation of plans such as a domestic biodiversity monitoring framework, Indigenous perspectives, and provincial and territorial profiles for each of the 23 strategies.

== Criticism of the strategy ==
Although biodiversity exists at many levels, from genetics to communities to ecosystems, and varies depending on type and organization, most conservation plans - the Canadian Biodiversity Strategy included - tend to focus on tangible, easily measured, visible aspects of biodiversity: species.

== See also ==
- Biodiversity
- Convention on Biological Diversity
- Canada's Biodiversity Convention Office
- Canadian Biodiversity Information Network
- Biodiversity Outcomes Framework
- Criticisms of the biodiversity paradigm
