= Vishal Garg (businessman) =

American businessman

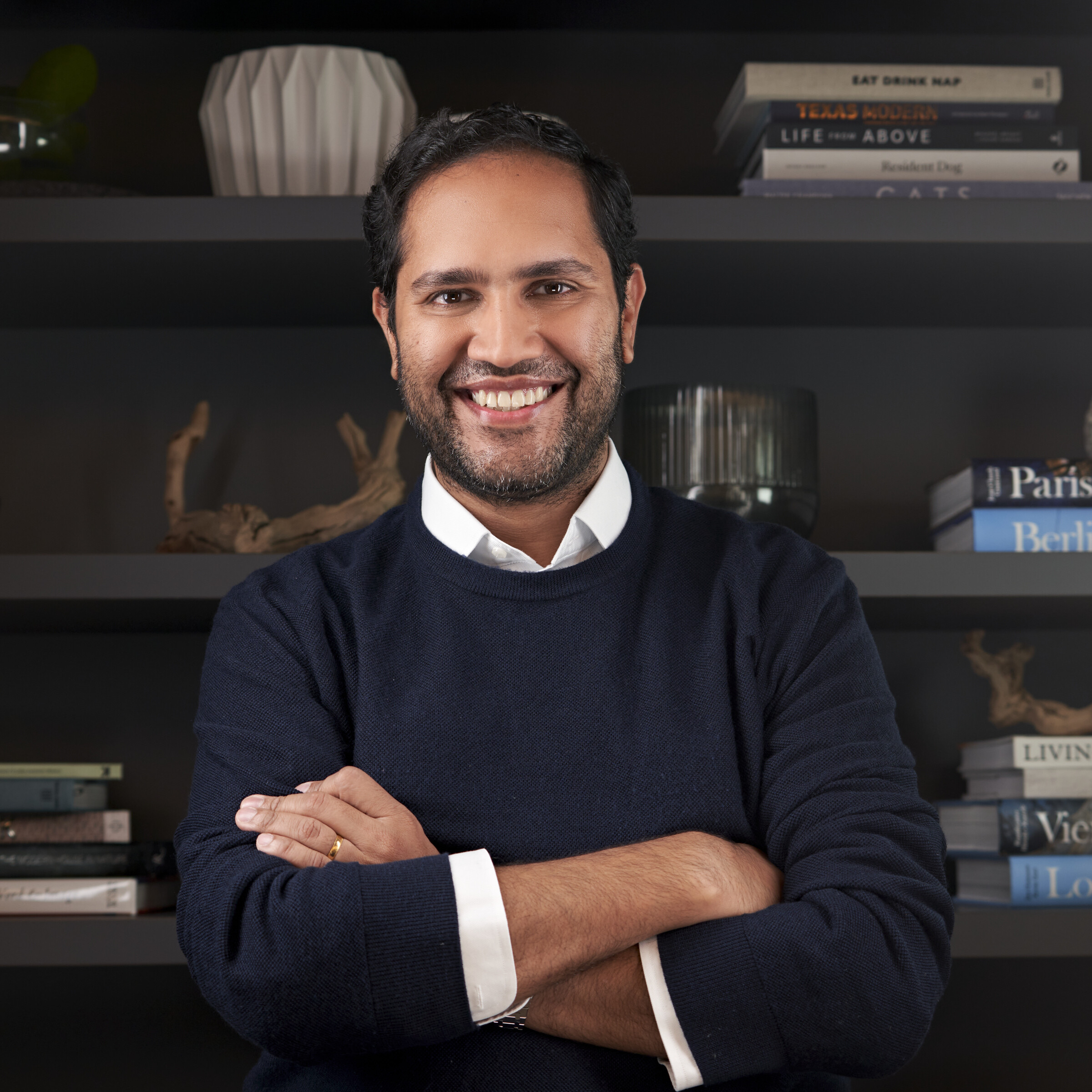
- Born: 1977 or 1978 (age 47–48)
- Education: New York University Stern School of Business
- Known for: Founder of Better.com and MyRichUncle
- Spouse: Sarita James
- Website: www.vishal-garg.com

Vishal Garg (born 1977 or 1978) is an Indian-American businessman who founded Better.com and MyRichUncle.

== Early life and education ==
Garg was born in India. He lived there until the age of 8, when his family relocated to the United States. Garg and his family lived in Forest Hills, Queens, and he graduated from Stuyvesant High School in 1995. While attending high school, he worked as an entry clerk and runner for Salomon Brothers. Garg received Bachelor's degrees in finance and international business from the New York University Stern School of Business.

== Career ==
After graduating university, Garg worked in the mergers and acquisitions department at Morgan Stanley as an analyst. He quit the job on his 21st birthday and founded One Zero Capital, a small hedge fund that invested in technology companies in India and Latin America.

In 2000, with the profits from his hedge fund, Garg co-founded a student finance company that became MyRichUncle, which grew to employ 300 people and became the second largest private student lender in the United States. The company became a public company in 2005 but filed for bankruptcy under Chapter 7, Title 11, United States Code during the 2008 financial crisis.

In 2009, Garg co-founded special servicing company EIFC. Beginning in August 2009, Garg jointly led a new asset-backed securities team at Aram Global, an asset recovery firm.

In 2013, Garg co-founded Future Finance, a provider of student loans to students in the UK, with Brian Norton.

In 2014, he founded Climb Credit, targeted at US programs with relatively lower costs and higher graduate employment rates, with Zander Rafael and Amit Sinha.

Also in 2014, after a frustrating experience trying to obtain a mortgage, Garg founded Better.com, an online mortgage broker. Garg acquired Avex Funding of California to provide the new company with licenses and an operating platform to originate mortgages online. The company became a public company via a merger with a special-purpose acquisition company in 2023.

In November 2020, Garg was a defendant in litigation brought by his former business partner Raza Khan and by other parties, with allegations of fraud and misappropriation of funds at prior business ventures including MyRichUncle and CDO administrator EIFC.

In November 2020, Garg was quoted in an e-mail in which he chided employees as "a bunch of DUMB DOLPHINS". In December 2021, a video was disseminated of him abruptly firing 900 people in the United States and India through a videotelephony call. He also insulted Better.com employees on Blind. After much criticism, Garg took approximately a month off, returning in January 2022. He apologized and wrote in a letter to employees that he had "failed to show the appropriate amount of respect and appreciation for the individuals who were affected".

On August 3, 2026, Garg was fired by the board of Better.com, with all board members except for Garg voting to remove him. After the firing, Better.com sued Garg, alleging that he broke the Securities Exchange Act of 1934. On August 13, 2026, Garg stated that he was attempting to regain control of the company and claimed to have support from shareholders to replace the board.

== Personal life ==
Garg lives in Manhattan with his wife, Sarita James, and three children. Garg has made donations to political candidates and organizations including the Serve America PAC supporting veterans and several members of the Democratic Party, including Kamala Harris, Joe Biden, and Elizabeth Warren.

== See also ==
- Indians in the New York City metropolitan area
