= Cash offer =

Real estate purchase made without financing contingencies

A cash offer refers to an offer made to purchase real estate submitted by purchasers who do not require any financing since they do not require a mortgage. The purchase is referred to as an "all-cash buyer." Such a buyer may also waive the appraisal, although not necessarily, since the contingency may exist to test or ensure the property's market value. The term “cash offer” is typically applied to contracts in which both of these contingencies do not appear. Cash offers are common in markets like Denver, Colorado, Seattle, Los Angeles, and are compounded by the limited supply of homes.

Cash offers account for over 28% of all home sales as of 2018 according to The Wall Street Journal. Because of the absence of one or more contingencies in cash offers, they are preferred by sellers who perceive risks in delays, the execution of underwriting, or in the application of appraisal valuation models. Sellers may reject financed offers in preference to cash offers, even when net proceeds would be lower, because of these perceived risks. This problem is all the more acute for first time homebuyers who do not yet have the funds to submit for a significant down payment let alone an all cash offer. A cash offer can be a really important tool in helping real estate investors get more deals because if you are able to pay cash you can close more quickly.

Other lenders assist mortgage buyers compete against cash offers. For example, a mortgage company may provide a buyer a commitment prior to identifying a home. This differs from a pre-approval letter, which is a formal estimate of what a buyer can afford - not an obligation. A commitment, however, does not account for the appraisal contingency, which can adversely effect the strength of a mortgage offer in competitive markets.

Not all cash offers are alike. Most of the cash offers are coming from real estate investors. Some of these investors will get a contract on your house as a cash offer and then reassign the contract to a company that rehabs houses.
