= Biodiversity Outcomes Framework =

Canada's Biodiversity Outcomes Framework was approved by Ministers responsible for Environment, Forests, Parks, Fisheries and Aquaculture, and Wildlife in October 2006. It has been developed further to the Canadian Biodiversity Strategy, an implementation measure required under Article 6 of the United Nations Convention on Biological Diversity.

== Criticism of the Framework ==
The Framework has been developed from the Canadian Biodiversity Strategy, which has been criticized as having a tendency to focus on species and to assign less importance to other scales of biodiversity from the genetic to the ecosystem level.

== See also ==
- Criticisms of the biodiversity paradigm
