= Tier 1 capital =

Financial strength measure for banks

- Bank regulatory capital
- CET1 and AT1 make up Tier 1 capital.
- Other names: Core capital; going-concern capital
- Framework: Basel I (1988); recast in Basel III
- Published: July 1988; December 2010
- Component of: Total regulatory capital, with Tier 2 capital
- Composed of: Common Equity Tier 1 and Additional Tier 1
- Role: Going-concern loss absorption
- Minimum ratio: 6% of risk-weighted assets
- Of which CET1: 4.5% of risk-weighted assets
- Also used in: Leverage ratio (numerator)

Tier 1 capital is the core measure of a bank's financial strength from a regulator's point of view. Under the Basel III standards of the Basel Committee on Banking Supervision (BCBS), it is going-concern capital: the sum of Common Equity Tier 1 (CET1) and Additional Tier 1 (AT1), after regulatory adjustments. CET1 consists primarily of common stock, share premium, retained earnings and other disclosed reserves. AT1 consists of instruments that absorb losses while the bank remains open but do not meet the CET1 tests, such as perpetual non-cumulative preferred stock.

Capital in this sense is related to, but different from, the accounting concept of shareholders' equity. Both Tier 1 and Tier 2 capital were first defined in the Basel I accord and remained substantially the same in Basel II. Under those accords, Tier 1 (also called core capital) consisted mainly of common stock and disclosed reserves, and could also include non-redeemable non-cumulative preferred stock. From 1998 the BCBS also allowed a limited class of "innovative" instruments, capped at 15% of Tier 1 capital; those instruments were phased out under Basel III from 2013. Tier 2 capital is gone-concern "supplementary capital" such as general loan-loss reserves and subordinated debt.

Each country's banking regulator, however, has some discretion over how differing financial instruments may count in a capital calculation, because the legal framework varies in different legal systems.

The theoretical reason for holding capital is that it should provide protection against unexpected losses. This is not the same as expected losses, which are covered by provisions, reserves and current year profits. Under Basel I the minimum Tier 1 ratio was 4% of risk-weighted assets. Under Basel III, banks must hold CET1 of at least 4.5% of risk-weighted assets and Tier 1 capital of at least 6% (total capital at least 8%). A 2.5% CET1 capital conservation buffer sits above those minima.

== Tier 1 capital ratio ==
The Tier 1 capital ratio is the ratio of a bank's Tier 1 capital to its total risk-weighted assets (RWA). Risk-weighted assets are the total of all assets held by the bank weighted by credit risk according to a formula determined by the regulator (usually the country's central bank). Most central banks follow the BCBS guidelines in setting formulae for asset risk weights. Assets like cash and currency usually have zero risk weight, while certain loans have a risk weight at 100% of their face value. The BCBS is a part of the Bank for International Settlements (BIS). Under BCBS guidelines total RWA is not limited to credit risk. It contains components for market risk (typically based on value at risk (VaR)) and operational risk. The BCBS rules for calculation of the components of total RWA have seen a number of changes following the 2008 financial crisis. The same Tier 1 measure is the numerator of the Basel III leverage ratio.

As an example, assume a bank with $2 of equity lends out $10 to a client. Assuming that the loan, now a $10 asset on the bank's balance sheet, carries a risk weighting of 90%, the bank now holds risk-weighted assets of $9 ($10 × 90%). Using the original equity of $2, the bank's Tier 1 ratio is calculated to be $2/$9 or 22%.

There are two ratios in common use:

- the CET1 ratio (sometimes still called the Tier 1 common capital ratio); and
- the Tier 1 capital ratio.

AT1 instruments, such as non-redeemable non-cumulative preferred shares, are included in Tier 1 but not in CET1. As a result, the CET1 ratio will always be less than or equal to the Tier 1 ratio. In the example above, the two ratios are the same.

== See also ==
- Bank for International Settlements – International financial institution owned by central banks
- Bank stress tests – Simulation of a financial asset or institution under crisis conditions
- Capital requirement – Required amount of capital needed by financial institutions
- reserve requirement – Type of regulation on commercial banks
- Common Equity Tier 1
- Contingent convertible bond – Type of financial instrument
- Tier 2 capital – Type of banking capital
- Additional Tier 1
