= Conversational user interface =

Computer interface emulating a conversation

A conversational user interface (CUI) is a user interface for computers that emulates a conversation with a human. Historically, computers have relied on text-based user interfaces and graphical user interfaces (GUIs) (such as the user pressing a "back" button) to translate the user's desired action into commands the computer understands. While an effective mechanism of completing computing actions, there is a learning curve for the user associated with GUI. Instead, CUIs provide opportunity for the user to communicate with the computer in their natural language rather than in a syntax specific commands.

== See also ==
- Chatbot
- Voice user interface
- Natural language processing
- User interface design
