= Voice user interface =

Interface for spoken human interaction with computers

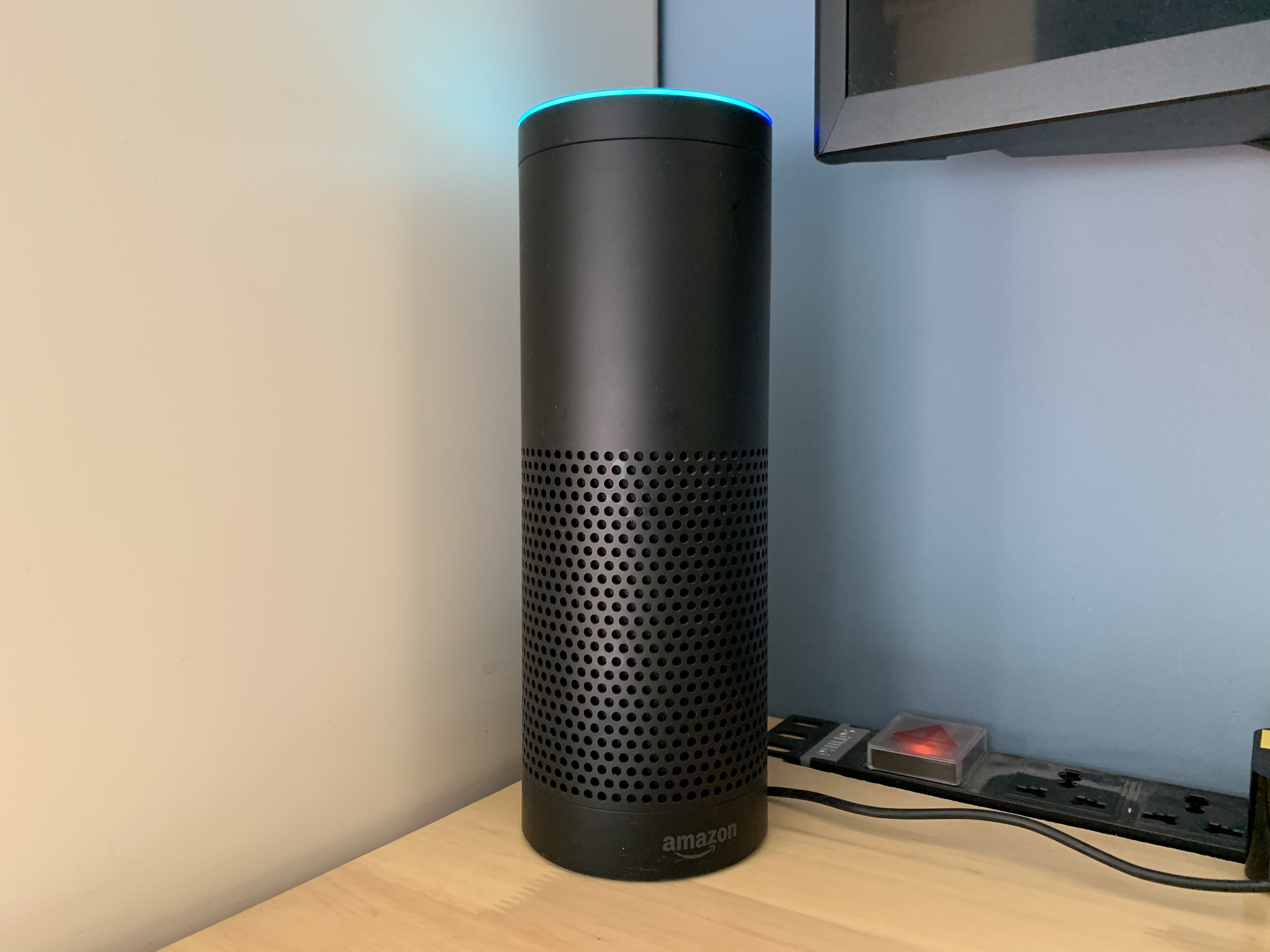
Amazon Echo

A voice user interface (VUI) enables spoken human interaction with computers, using speech recognition to understand spoken commands and answer questions, and typically text to speech to play a reply. A voice command device is a device controlled with a voice user interface.

Voice user interfaces have been added to automobiles, home automation systems, computer operating systems, home appliances like washing machines and microwave ovens, and television remote controls. They are the primary way of interacting with virtual assistants on smartphones and smart speakers. Older automated attendants (which route phone calls to the correct extension) and interactive voice response systems (which conduct more complicated transactions over the phone) can respond to the pressing of keypad buttons via DTMF tones, but those with a full voice user interface allow callers to speak requests and responses without having to press any buttons.

Newer voice command devices are speaker-independent, so they can respond to multiple voices, regardless of accent or dialectal influences. They are also capable of responding to several commands at once, separating vocal messages, and providing appropriate feedback, accurately imitating a natural conversation.

== Overview ==
A VUI is the interface to any speech application. Only a short time ago, controlling a machine by simply talking to it was only possible in science fiction. Until recently, this area was considered to be artificial intelligence. However, advances in technologies like text-to-speech, speech-to-text, natural language processing, and cloud services contributed to the mass adoption of these types of interfaces. VUIs have become more commonplace, and people are taking advantage of the value that these hands-free, eyes-free interfaces provide in many situations.

VUIs rely on the ability to process input reliably; inconsistent performance often leads to decreased user engagement and negative feedback. Designing a good VUI requires interdisciplinary talents in computer science, linguistics and human factors such as psychology. Even with advanced development tools, constructing an effective VUI requires understanding both the tasks to be performed and the target audience that will use the final system. The closer the VUI matches the user's mental model of the task, the easier it will be to use with little or no training, resulting in both higher efficiency and higher user satisfaction.

A VUI designed for the general public should emphasize ease of use and provide a lot of help and guidance for first-time callers. In contrast, a VUI designed for a small group of power users (including field service workers) should focus more on productivity and less on help and guidance. Such applications should streamline the call flows, minimize prompts, eliminate unnecessary iterations and allow elaborate "mixed initiative dialogs", which enable callers to enter several pieces of information in a single utterance and in any order or combination. In short, speech applications have to be carefully crafted for the specific business process being automated.

Not all business processes render themselves equally well for speech automation. In general, the more complex the inquiries and transactions are, the more challenging they will be to automate, and the more likely they will be to fail with the general public. In some scenarios, automation is simply not applicable, so live agent assistance is the only option. A legal advice hotline, for example, would be very difficult to automate. On the flip side, speech is perfect for handling quick and routine transactions, like changing the status of a work order, completing a time or expense entry, or transferring funds between accounts.

== History ==
Early applications for VUI included voice-activated dialing of phones, either directly or through a (typically Bluetooth) headset or vehicle audio system.

In 2007, a CNN business article reported that voice command was over a billion-dollar industry and that companies like Google and Apple were trying to create speech recognition features. In the years since the article was published, the world has witnessed a variety of voice command devices. Additionally, Google has created a speech recognition engine called Pico TTS and Apple released Siri. Voice command devices are becoming more widely available, and innovative ways of using the human voice are always being created. For example, Business Week suggests that the future remote controller will be the human voice. Currently Xbox Live allows such features and Jobs hinted at such a feature on the new Apple TV.

== Voice command software products on computing devices ==
Both Apple Mac and Windows PC provide built-in speech recognition features in their latest operating systems.

=== Microsoft Windows ===
Two Microsoft operating systems, Windows 7 and Windows Vista, provide speech recognition capabilities. Microsoft integrated voice commands into their operating systems to provide a mechanism for people who want to limit their use of the mouse and keyboard, but still want to maintain or increase their overall productivity.

==== Windows Vista ====
With Windows Vista voice control, a user may dictate documents and emails in mainstream applications, start and switch between applications, control the operating system, format documents, save documents, edit files, efficiently correct errors, and fill out forms on the Web. The speech recognition software learns automatically every time a user uses it, and speech recognition is available in English (U.S.), English (U.K.), German (Germany), French (France), Spanish (Spain), Japanese, Chinese (Traditional), and Chinese (Simplified). In addition, the software comes with an interactive tutorial, which can be used to train both the user and the speech recognition engine.

==== Windows 7 ====
In addition to all the features provided in Windows Vista, Windows 7 provides a wizard for setting up the microphone and a tutorial on how to use the feature.

==== Mac OS X ====
All Mac OS X computers come with speech recognition software pre-installed. The software is user-independent and allows a user to "navigate menus and enter keyboard shortcuts; speak checkbox names, radio button names, list items, and button names; and open, close, control, and switch among applications." However, the Apple website recommends a user buy a commercial product called Dictate.

=== Commercial products ===
If a user is not satisfied with the built-in speech recognition software or a user does not have built-in speech recognition software for their OS, then a user may experiment with a commercial product such as Braina Pro or DragonNaturallySpeaking for Windows PCs, and Dictate, the name of the same software for Mac OS.

== Voice command mobile devices ==
Any mobile device running Android OS, Microsoft Windows Phone, iOS 9 or later, or BlackBerry OS provides voice command capabilities. In addition to the built-in speech recognition software for each mobile phone's operating system, a user may download third-party voice command applications from each operating system's application store: Apple App Store, Google Play, Windows Phone Marketplace (initially Windows Marketplace for Mobile), or BlackBerry App World.

=== Android OS ===
Google has developed an open-source operating system called Android, which allows a user to perform voice commands such as: send text messages, listen to music, get directions, call businesses, call contacts, send email, view a map, go to websites, write a note, and search Google. Speech recognition software is available on all devices since Android 2.2 "Froyo", but the settings must be set to English. Google allows the user to change the language, and the user is prompted when he or she first uses the speech recognition feature if he or she would like their voice data to be attached to their Google account. If a user decides to opt into this service, it allows Google to train the software to the user's voice.

Google introduced the Google Assistant with Android 7.0 "Nougat". It is much more advanced than the older version.

Amazon.com has the Echo that uses Amazon's custom version of Android to provide a voice interface.

=== Microsoft Windows ===
Windows Phone is Microsoft's mobile device's operating system. On Windows Phone 7.5, the speech app is user independent and can be used to: call someone from your contact list, call any phone number, redial the last number, send a text message, call your voice mail, open an application, read appointments, query phone status, and search the web. In addition, speech can also be used during a phone call, and the following actions are possible during a phone call: press a number, turn the speakerphone on, or call someone, which puts the current call on hold.

Windows 10 introduces Cortana, a voice control system that replaces the voice control formerly used on Windows phones.

=== iOS ===
Apple added Voice Control to its family of iOS devices as a new feature of iPhone OS 3. The iPhone 4S, iPad 3, iPad Mini 1G, iPad Air, iPad Pro 1G, iPod Touch 5G and later, all come with a more advanced voice assistant called Siri. Voice Control can still be enabled through the Settings menu of newer devices. Siri is a user-independent built-in speech recognition feature that allows a user to issue voice commands. With the assistance of Siri a user may issue commands like send a text message, check the weather, set a reminder, find information, schedule meetings, send an email, find a contact, set an alarm, get directions, track your stocks, set a timer, and ask for examples of sample voice command queries. In addition, Siri works with Bluetooth and wired headphones.

Apple introduced Personal Voice as an accessibility feature in iOS 17, launched on September 18, 2023. This feature allows users to create a personalized, machine learning-generated (AI) version of their voice for use in text-to-speech applications. Designed particularly for individuals with speech impairments, Personal Voice helps preserve the unique sound of a user's voice. It enhances Siri and other accessibility tools by providing a more personalized and inclusive user experience. Personal Voice reflects Apple's ongoing commitment to accessibility and innovation.

=== Amazon Alexa ===
In 2014 Amazon introduced the Alexa smart home device. Its main purpose was just a smart speaker that allowed the consumer to control the device with their voice. Eventually, it turned into a novelty device that could control home appliances with voice. Now almost all the appliances are controllable with Alexa, including light bulbs and temperature. By allowing voice control, Alexa can connect to smart home technology allowing users to lock their house, control the temperature, and activate various devices. This form of AI allows someone to ask a question, and Alexa searches, finds, and recites the answer.

== Speech recognition in cars ==
As car technology improves, more features will be added to cars and these features could potentially distract a driver. Voice commands for cars, according to CNET, should allow a driver to issue commands and not be distracted. CNET stated that Nuance was suggesting that in the future they would create a software that resembled Siri, but for cars. Most speech recognition software on the market in 2011 had only about 50 to 60 voice commands, but Ford Sync had 10,000. However, CNET suggested that even 10,000 voice commands were not sufficient given the complexity and the variety of tasks a user may want to do while driving. Voice commands for cars are different from voice commands for mobile phones and for computers because a driver may use the feature to look for nearby restaurants, look for gas, driving directions, road conditions, and the location of the nearest hotel. Currently, technology allows a driver to issue voice commands on both a portable GPS like a Garmin and a car manufacturer navigation system.

List of Voice Command Systems Provided By Motor Manufacturers:

- Ford Sync
- Lexus Voice Command
- Chrysler UConnect
- Honda Accord
- GM IntelliLink
- BMW
- Mercedes
- Pioneer
- Harman
- Hyundai

== Non-verbal input ==
While most voice user interfaces are designed to support interaction through spoken human language, there have also been recent explorations in designing interfaces that take non-verbal human sounds as input. In these systems, the user controls the interface by emitting non-speech sounds such as humming, whistling, or blowing into a microphone.

One such example of a non-verbal voice user interface is Blendie, an interactive art installation created by Kelly Dobson. The piece comprised a classic 1950s-era blender which was retrofitted to respond to microphone input. To control the blender, the user must mimic the whirring mechanical sounds that a blender typically makes: the blender will spin slowly in response to a user's low-pitched growl, and increase in speed as the user makes higher-pitched vocal sounds.

Another example is VoiceDraw, a research system that enables digital drawing for individuals with limited motor abilities. VoiceDraw allows users to "paint" strokes on a digital canvas by modulating vowel sounds, which are mapped to brush directions. Modulating other paralinguistic features (e.g. the loudness of their voice) allows the user to control different features of the drawing, such as the thickness of the brush stroke.

Other approaches include adopting non-verbal sounds to augment touch-based interfaces (e.g. on a mobile phone) to support new types of gestures that wouldn't be possible with finger input alone.

== Design challenges ==
Voice interfaces pose a substantial number of challenges for usability. In contrast to graphical user interfaces (GUIs), best practices for voice interface design are still emergent.

=== Discoverability ===
With purely audio-based interaction, voice user interfaces tend to suffer from low discoverability: it is difficult for users to understand the scope of a system's capabilities. In order for the system to convey what is possible without a visual display, it would need to enumerate the available options, which can become tedious or infeasible. Low discoverability often results in users reporting confusion over what they are "allowed" to say, or a mismatch in expectations about the breadth of a system's understanding.

=== Transcription ===
While speech recognition technology has improved considerably in recent years, voice user interfaces still suffer from parsing or transcription errors in which a user's speech is not interpreted correctly. These errors tend to be especially prevalent when the speech content uses technical vocabulary (e.g. medical terminology) or unconventional spellings such as musical artist or song names.

=== Understanding ===
Effective system design to maximize conversational understanding remains an open area of research. Voice user interfaces that interpret and manage conversational state are challenging to design due to the inherent difficulty of integrating complex natural language processing tasks like coreference resolution, named-entity recognition, information retrieval, and dialog management. Most voice assistants today are capable of executing single commands very well but limited in their ability to manage dialogue beyond a narrow task or a couple turns in a conversation.

== Privacy implications ==
Privacy concerns are raised by the fact that voice commands are available to the providers of voice-user interfaces in unencrypted form, and can thus be shared with third parties and be processed in an unauthorized or unexpected manner. Additionally to the linguistic content of recorded speech, a user's manner of expression and voice characteristics can implicitly contain information about his or her biometric identity, personality traits, body shape, physical and mental health condition, sex, gender, moods and emotions, socioeconomic status and geographical origin.

== See also ==
- Speech synthesis
- List of speech recognition software
- Natural-language user interface
- User interface design
- Voice browser
- Speech recognition in Linux
- Linguatronic
- Voice computing
