= Surplus note =

Bond-like instrument

In the United States a contingent surplus note, also known as an emergency subordinated bond, is a bond-like instrument issued by an insurance company, developed in the 1990s by non-capitalized mutual insurance companies as a means of raising money. Surplus notes are debt-like in that they pay a coupon and have a finite maturity. However, in many cases, state insurance regulators have allowed insurance companies to classify the capital raised via surplus notes as “surplus” (which is the statutory equivalent of equity), because surplus note holders are last in line to make a claim on the company's assets in a default scenario, much like where equity holders reside in a public company.

These securities are subordinated obligations and fall at the very bottom of the operating insurance company's capital structure. They are issued primarily by mutual insurance companies, which are not public and are owned instead by their policy holders. The motivation for mutual companies to issue these instruments was to raise surplus (or equity) in response to new risk-based capital guidelines developed in the early 1990s. Because mutual companies are owned by policyholders, not shareholders, there was no alternative method to raise surplus or equity. While surplus note holders have last the claim on the assets of the operating insurance company, it is important to realize that this claim is at the operating company level, which is still ahead of holding company obligations.
