= Unfunded loan commitments =

Unfunded loan commitments are those commitments made by a financial institution that are contractual obligations for future funding. They should not be confused with Letters of credit which require certain trigger events before funding is needed. Increasingly, originating lending institutions are selling Senior loans and related funded or unfunded commitments to institutional investors like Investment management firms, mutual funds and insurance companies.

Typically, unfunded commitments are separated into two categories:

- Multiple Advance, Closed End: This type of loan (typically a construction loan) advances incremental amounts up to a certain limit, based upon some criteria such as inspection and approval of a draw request. Any principal reductions received during the loan period are not available to be drawn on, but rather have paid down the loan balance.
- Revolving or Open End: This type of loan (known informally as a Line of credit) allows the borrower to continue to borrow up to the original loan amount. Principal reductions are immediately available for future advances.

Banks are required to report unfunded commitments on schedule RC-L of the quarterly Report of Condition and Income (Call Report).
