= Thrift Financial Report =

All regulated financial institutions in the United States are required to file periodic financial and other information with their respective regulators and other parties. Thrifts are required by the Office of Thrift Supervision (OTS), among other requirements, to file a key quarterly financial report called the Thrift Financial Report (TFR) to be filed electronically with the OTS.

== Regulatory requirements and proposed changes ==
Specifically, OTS regulation 12 CFR 563.180 requires the completion of the TFR by all savings associations as defined in 12 CFR 561.43. The TFR is filed electronically on a quarterly basis and is due no later than 30 days after quarter end, except for Schedule HC, Thrift Holding Company, and Schedule CMR, Consolidated Maturity and Rate, which are due no later than 45 days after quarter end. In 2007, there had been a proposal that thrifts convert to filing a similar report, the Report of Condition and Income commonly referred to as the Call Report, which banks prepare and file with the Federal Deposit Insurance Corporation. Since thrifts continue to file TFRs today, the proposal was dismissed or set aside for the time being.

== Content of reports (schedules) ==
The TFR contains 17 schedules, which include financial statements and supplemental information filed for the reporting savings association consolidated with its subsidiaries. Information on the TFR, including income and expense and cash flow data, is reported for the quarter, not year-to-date, with the exception of Schedule FS, Fiduciary and Related Services, in which fiduciary and related services income is reported for the calendar year-to-date. Most information on the TFR is available to the public for individual institutions; however, certain information is considered proprietary and is not released. All data are released in aggregate form. See this list of TFR schedules and their availability to the public. The TFR comprises these 17 schedules, not all of which may be viewable online for a filer:

- Schedule NS – Optional Narrative Statement – Statement by institution management concerning issues relevant to the TFR
- Schedule SC – Consolidated Statement of Condition – Assets, liabilities and equity capital
- Schedule SO – Consolidated Statement of Operations – Income and expense
- Schedule VA – Consolidated Valuation Allowances – Reconciliation of valuation allowances, charge-offs and recoveries, and other data on troubled assets
- Schedule PD – Consolidated Past Due and Nonaccrual – Information on delinquent and nonaccrual loans
- Schedule LD – Consolidated Loan Data – Information on high loan-to-value loans secured by 1–4 family residential properties without PMI or government guarantee
- Schedule CC – Consolidated Commitments and Contingencies
- Schedule CF – Consolidated Cash Flow Information – Information on mortgage, deposit, and other activity affecting cash flow during the quarter
- Schedule DI – Consolidated Deposit Information – Information on deposits and escrows
- Schedule SI – Supplemental Information – Information on QTL, loans to insiders, reconciliation of equity capital, transactions with affiliates, mutual fund and annuity sales, average balance sheet data, and other data
- Schedule SQ – Consolidated Supplemental Questions – Questions concerning structural and other activity during the quarter
- Schedule SB – Consolidated Small Business Loans – Data completed annually as of June 30 to comply with Section 122 of the FDIC Improvement Act during the quarter
- Schedule FS – Fiduciary and Related Services – Data on trust assets and activities. Summary data is completed quarterly; more detailed information is reported annually at December 31
- Schedule HC – Thrift Holding Company – Summary of holding company financial data for both the parent only and consolidated
- Schedule CSS – Subordinate Organization Schedule: Information on required subordinate organizations and joint ventures, completed annually at December 31
- Schedule CCR – Consolidated Capital Requirements – Balances necessary to compute the OTS minimum capital requirement
- Schedule CMR – Consolidated Maturity and Rate – Information on interest rate and repricing/maturity characteristics of selected balance-sheet and off-balance-sheet items
