= Call report =

Regulatory financial report filed by U.S. banks each quarter

All regulated financial institutions in the United States are required to file periodic financial and other information with their respective regulators and other parties. For banks in the U.S., one of the key reports required to be filed is the quarterly Consolidated Report of Condition and Income, generally referred to as the call report or RC report. Specifically, every National Bank, State Member Bank and insured Nonmember Bank is required by the Federal Financial Institutions Examination Council (FFIEC) to file a call report as of the close of business on the last day of each calendar quarter, i.e. the report date. The specific reporting requirements depend upon the size of the bank and whether or not it has any foreign offices. Call reports are due no later than 30 days after the end of each calendar quarter. Revisions may be made without prejudice up to 30 days after the initial filing period. Form FFIEC 031 is used for banks with both domestic (U.S.) and foreign (non-U.S.) offices; Forms FFIEC 041 and 051 is for banks with domestic (U.S.) offices only.

The Federal Deposit Insurance Corporation (FDIC) is responsible for overseeing insured financial institution adherence to FFIEC reporting requirements, including the observance of all bank regulatory agency rules and regulations, accounting principles and pronouncements adopted by the Financial Accounting Standards Board (FASB) and all other matters relating to a call report submission. Call reports are required by statute and collected by the FDIC under the provision of Section 1817(a)(1) of the Federal Deposit Insurance Act.

The FDIC collects, corrects, updates and stores call report data submitted by all insured national and state nonmember commercial banks and state-chartered savings banks on a quarterly basis. Call reports data are a widely used source of timely and accurate financial data regarding a bank's financial condition and the results of its operations. The information is extensively used by the bank regulatory agencies in their daily offsite bank monitoring activities. call reports data are also used by the public, the Congress of the United States, state banking authorities, researchers, bank rating agencies and the academic community. The FDIC is fully responsible for maintaining an accurate and up-to-date call reports data base readily available to all users. call reports data are a critical publicly available source of information regarding the status of U.S. banking system.

Thrifts filed a related report known as the Thrift Financial Report or TFR. Following the merger of the OTS and the OCC, thrifts had the option of filing either a call report or a TFR. Beginning with the first quarter filing in 2012, all thrifts are required to file a call report and no longer have the option to file a TFR.

Call reports for credit unions are submitted quarterly to the National Credit Union Administration.

Call reports (company specific or aggregated) information is publicly available at the FDIC website. Each call report is reviewed by an FDIC analyst for errors, omissions or a variety of audit flags.

== Call report content (schedules) ==
The call report is divided into a number of schedules as follows:

- RI—Income statement
- RI-A—Changes in bank equity capital
- RI-B—Charge-offs and recoveries on loans and leases and changes in allowance for loan and lease losses
- RI-C—Disaggregated Data on the Allowance for Loan and Lease Losses
- RI-D—Income from foreign offices (FFIEC 031-only)
- RI-E—Explanations
- RC—Balance sheet
- RC-A—Cash and balances due from depository institutions
- RC-B—Securities
- RC-C, Part I—Loans and leases
- RC-C, Part II—Loans to small businesses and small farms
- RC-D—Trading assets and liabilities
- RC-E—Deposit liabilities
- RC-F—Other assets
- RC-G—Other liabilities
- RC-H—Selected balance sheet items for domestic offices (FFIEC 031-only)
- RC-I—Assets and liabilities of IBFs (FFIEC 031-only)
- RC-K—Quarterly averages
- RC-L—Derivatives and off-balance sheet items
- RC-M—Memoranda
- RC-N—Past due and nonaccrual loans, leases and other assets
- RC-O—Other data for deposit insurance and FICO assessments
- RC-P—1-4 family residential mortgage banking activities
- RC-Q—Assets and liabilities measured at fair value on a recurring basis
- RC-R—Regulatory capital
- RC-S—Servicing, securitization, and asset sale activities
- RC-T—Fiduciary and related services
- RC-V—Variable interest entities
- SU—Supplemental Information (FFIEC 051-only)
- Optional narrative statement—concerning the amounts reported in the reports of condition and income
