= Tier 2 capital =

Type of banking capital

Tier 2 capital, or supplementary capital, includes a number of important and legitimate constituents of a bank's capital requirement. (Note: By definition of Bank for International Settlements.) These forms of banking capital were largely standardized in the Basel I accord, issued by the Basel Committee on Banking Supervision and left untouched by the Basel II accord. National regulators of most countries around the world have implemented these standards in local legislation. In the calculation of regulatory capital, Tier 2 is limited to 100% of Tier 1 capital.

== Undisclosed reserves ==
Undisclosed reserves are not common, but are accepted by some regulators where a bank has made a profit but the profit has not appeared in normal retained profits or in general reserves of the bank. Undisclosed reserves must be accepted by the bank's supervisory authorities. Many countries do not accept undisclosed reserves as an accounting concept or as a legitimate form of capital.

== Revaluation reserves ==
A revaluation reserve is a reserve created when a company has an asset revalued and an increase in value is brought to account. A simple example is the situation where a bank owns the land and building of its head-offices and bought the properties for $100 a century ago. A current revaluation is likely to reflect a large increase in value. The increase would be added to a revaluation reserve. The reserve may arise out of a formal revaluation carried through to the bank's balance sheet, or a notional addition due to holding securities in the balance sheet valued at historic cost. Basel II also requires that the difference between the historic cost and the actual value be discounted by 55% when using these reserves to calculate Tier 2 capital.

== General provisions ==
A general provision is created against losses which have not yet been identified. The provision qualifies for inclusion in Tier 2 capital as long it is not created against a known deterioration in value. The general provision is limited to

- 1.25% of RWA (Risk-weighted assets) for banks using the standardized approach
- 0.6% of credit risk-weighted assets for banks using the IRB approach

== Hybrid instruments ==
Hybrids are instruments that have some characteristics of both debt and equity. Provided these are close to equity in nature, in that they are able to take losses on the face value without triggering a liquidation of the bank, they may be counted as capital. Perpetual preferred stocks carrying a cumulative fixed charge are hybrid instruments. Cumulative perpetual preferred stocks are excluded from Tier 1.

== Subordinated term debt ==
Subordinated debt is debt that ranks lower than ordinary depositors of the bank. Only those with a minimum original term to maturity of five years can be included in the calculation of this form of capital; they must be subject to proper amortization arrangements.
