= List of NBA jersey sponsors =

The Nike Swoosh logo, which is featured on every NBA team's jersey.

Beginning with the 2017–18 NBA season, Nike Inc. became the uniform and apparel maker for the National Basketball Association (NBA). The Nike swoosh appeared on the front right shoulder of player uniforms for the first time in league history. In July 2020, the NBA and Jordan Brand announced that all 30 teams would feature the "Jumpman" logo on the front right shoulder of Statement jerseys, worn during big games or rivalries, and left leg of shorts beginning with the 2020–21 season. The Charlotte Hornets were the only team to feature the "Jumpman" logo previous to this announcement due to Michael Jordan's ownership.

Due to its presence in several soccer leagues around the world and Australian sports, the NBA announced that teams could sell one sponsorship to be featured over the front left shoulder of player uniforms beginning in the 2017–18 NBA season.

The following list denotes the sponsor for each of the 30 teams in the NBA:

Team	Current jersey sponsor	Previous jersey sponsor(s)	Photo
Atlanta Hawks	Paze	Sharecare (2017–2023) YMCA (The Y) (2023-2025)	
Boston Celtics	Amica	General Electric (GE) (2017–2020); Vistaprint (2020–2024)	
Brooklyn Nets	Alibaba Group	Infor (2017–2020); Motorola (M) (2020–2021); Webull (2021–2024) GetYourGuide (2024-2025) All In Won Med-Bill & IT, LLC (2025-2026)	
Charlotte Hornets	Judi Health	LendingTree (2017–2023); Feastables (2023–2024)	
Chicago Bulls	Motorola	Zenni Optical (Zenni) (2018–2022)	
Cleveland Cavaliers	Cleveland-Cliffs	Goodyear Tires (2017–2022)	
Dallas Mavericks	Chase Bank	5miles (2017–2019) Chime (2020-2026)	
Denver Nuggets	Ibotta	Western Union (WU) (2017–2023)	
Detroit Pistons	StockX	Flagstar Bank (2017–2021); United Wholesale Mortgage (2021–2024)	
Golden State Warriors	IREN	Rakuten (2017-2026)	
Houston Rockets	Memorial Hermann Health System	ROKiT Phones (ROKiT) (2017–2020); Credit Karma (2021–2024)	
Indiana Pacers	Lucas Oil	Motorola (M) (2018–2023); Spokenote (2024–2025)	
Los Angeles Clippers	Visit Rwanda	Bumble (2018–2020); Honey (2020–2023)	
Los Angeles Lakers	Albert	Wish (2017–2021); Bibigo (2021–2026)	
Memphis Grizzlies	Robinhood	FedEx (2018–2021)	
Miami Heat	Robinhood	Ultimate Software (2017–2020); UKG (2020–2023) (Note: Ultimate Software merged with Kronos Incorporated in April 2020 to officially become Ultimate Kronos Group (UKG).); Carnival Cruise Line (2023–24)	
Milwaukee Bucks	Uline	Harley-Davidson (2017–2020) Motorola (2021-2026)	
Minnesota Timberwolves	Sezzle	Fitbit (2017–2020); Aura (2021–2024)	
New Orleans Pelicans	NewAge Products	Zatarain's (2017–2020); Ibotta (2021–2024)	
New York Knicks	Experience Abu Dhabi	Squarespace (2017–2022); Sphere (2023–2024)	
Oklahoma City Thunder	Love's Travel Stops & Country Stores (Love's)		
Orlando Magic	Walt Disney World		
Philadelphia 76ers	Bloom Energy	StubHub (2017–2021) Crypto.com (2021-2026)	
Phoenix Suns	Paze	PayPal (2018-2026)	
Portland Trail Blazers	none	Performance Health (Biofreeze) (2018–2021); StormX (X) (2021–2022); Brightside Windows (2024–2025)	
Sacramento Kings	Sutter Health	Blue Diamond Growers (2017–2020); Dialpad (2021–2024); Reviver (2024–2025) Ann Phoong Law(2025-2026)	
San Antonio Spurs	Ledger.com	Frost Bank (2018-2021); Self Financial (2022–2024)	
Toronto Raptors	Sun Life Financial		
Utah Jazz	Health Equity	Qualtrics (5 For The Fight) (2017–2023)LiveView Technologies (2023-2026)	
Washington Wizards	none	Geico (2018–2021) Robinhood (2023-2026)	
