= PeopleDoc =

Cloud-based HR service delivery & document management platform

- Company type: Private
- Industry: Human Resources Information Technology and Services
- Founded: 2007
- Defunct: 2020
- Fate: Acquired by Ultimate Software, now UKG
- Headquarters: Paris
- Area served: North America; Europe
- Parent: Ultimate Software
- Website: mypeopledoc.com

PeopleDoc was a cloud-based human resources service delivery and document management platform that was founded in France. In 2018, it was acquired by Ultimate Software for approximately $300 million. UKG, the successor company of Ultimate Software delivers former PeopleDoc technology as part of their suite of solutions.

In 2014, it was named a "Cool Vendor in Human Capital Management" by consulting firm Gartner. Its customers include American Express, Fast Retailing, Georgetown University, Match.com, Starbucks and Motorola. The company has also established partnerships with SAP SuccessFactors, Workday, Grant Thorton LLP, PwC and Accenture.

== History ==
PeopleDoc started as Novapost in 2007, on the campus of the HEC Business School in Paris, as an idea to provide a unified digital file management system.

In 2009, PeopleDoc started developing cloud technology to assist HR administrative staff.

In 2014, PeopleDoc expanded its human resources software service and raised a $17.5 million Series B round led by Accel Partners.

In August 2015, PeopleDoc sponsored a national HR survey, focused on the intersection of technology, HR, and how HR professionals are handling documents.

In September 2015, PeopleDoc raised a $28 Million Series C round of investment led by Eurazeo, with existing investors Accel Partners, Alven Capital and Kernel Capital Partners participating as well.

In 2018, the company was acquired by Ultimate Software for $300 million in cash and stock.

In 2020, Ultimate Software merged with Kronos Incorporated to create UKG, Inc. PeopleDoc solutions were rebranded and added to UKG's suite portfolio of products.

== Software ==
PeopleDoc's human resources service delivery is composed of four main components :

- The HR document management system allows for employee and HR documents to be centralized from multiple sources, including paper and existing human resources systems, and stored in the cloud. This solution is now known as UKG Document Manager.
- The employee portal and the case management system both enable companies to automate HR processes, ensure consistency and regulatory compliance, and improve employee satisfaction. This solution now known as People Assist, part of UKG HR Service Delivery.
- The employee onboarding portal allows for electronic documents and electronic signatures via a company branded portal. This solution is no longer sold.
