= Tully Friedman =

American businessman (born 1942)

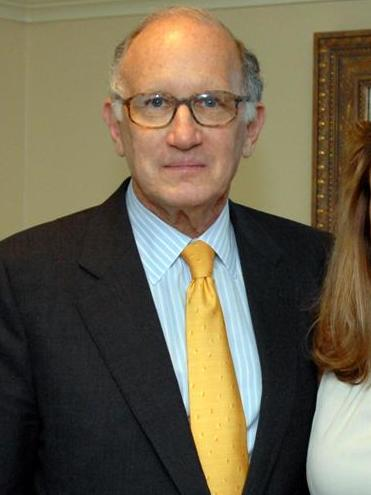
- Friedman in 2007
- Born: Tully Michael Friedman; 1942 (age 83–84)
- Education: Stanford University (BA); Harvard Law School (JD)
- Occupations: Businessman, investor, philanthropist
- Employer: Friedman, Fleischer and Lowe
- Known for: Co-founding Hellman & Friedman; FFL Partners
- Spouse(s): Anne Fay (divorced); Elise Dorsey

Tully Friedman (born January 1942) is an American businessman. A founding partner of Hellman & Friedman, as of 2013 he was chief executive of Friedman, Fleischer and Lowe, a San Francisco-based private equity firm.

== Early life ==
Tully Friedman earned a bachelor's degree from Stanford University and later received a Juris Doctor from Harvard Law School.

== Career ==
Friedman began his finance career at Salomon Brothers, where he served as a managing director and founded its West Coast Corporate Finance Department, and served on its national Corporate Finance Administrative Committee.

In 1984, he and Warren Hellman founded Hellman & Friedman, an investment company.

From 1984 through early 1997, Hellman & Friedman raised partnerships representing more than US $2.5 billion and made investments in about 40 companies.

In 1997, Friedman left Hellman & Friedman to co-found Friedman Fleischer & Lowe (now FFL Partners), a San Francisco–based private equity firm. The firm has raised multiple funds since its founding, with total committed capital exceeding US$4 billion.

In a 2013 interview, Friedman discussed changes in the private equity industry, citing increased competition and regulatory oversight since the 1990s. He noted that deal-sourcing strategies and fund structures had become more complex and that firms like FFL Partners had adapted accordingly.

== Board memberships and philanthropy ==
He sits on the boards of Clorox, Kool Smiles, NCDR, Church's Chicken, Cajun Operating Company, Archimedes Technology, and DPMS LLC. He previously served on the Boards of CapitalSource, Levi Strauss & Co., Mattel, and McKesson Corporation. He is a former president of the San Francisco Opera Association and chairman of Mount Zion Hospital and Medical Center. He is also chairman of the board of trustees of the American Enterprise Institute. He also sits on the board of trustees of the Telluride Foundation in Telluride, Colorado. and St. Paul's School in Concord, New Hampshire.

== Personal life ==
Friedman was first married to Ann Fay Barry, a descendant of Paul B. Fay. In 1995, he married Elise Dorsey in an Episcopal ceremony in Sonoma, California. They have two children, Alexander and Allegra. Until November 2012, Friedman owned a neo-classical-style home in Woodside, California, that was featured in the book, Extraordinary Homes California: an Exclusive Showcase of the Finest Architects, Designers and Builders in California.
