= Aron Ain =

American software technology executive, author, and CEO of Kronos Incorporated

- Education: Hamilton College
- Occupations: Software technology executive, author
- Known for: UKG, Kronos Incorporated

Aron Ain is an American software technology executive and author. He became the CEO of UKG (Ultimate Kronos Group) in 2020, a role he held until being named UKG Executive Chair, effective July 1, 2022. UKG was created from the merger of Ultimate Software and Kronos Incorporated. Previously, Ain had been the chief executive officer of Kronos Incorporated since 2005.

== Career ==
Ain joined Kronos in 1979 and has played a role in nearly every functional department at the organization. In October 2005, he was named chief executive officer and a member of the Kronos Board of Directors.

In 2007, Ain led the effort to take the company private, after going public in 1992.

Under his leadership, the company completed a major, multi-year business transformation, changing from a licensed-software model to a cloud, software-as-a-service (SaaS) model.

In 2016, Ain introduced new benefits to employees such as open vacation time and student loan repayment. A new manager performance rating was also created, called the Manager Effectiveness Index (MEI), which captures employee judgments about managers' performance.

In 2017, Kronos relocated its headquarters to the Crosspoint Towers in Lowell, Massachusetts.

In 2018, Ain published his book, WorkInspired: How to Build an Organization Where Everyone Loves to Work. The book chronicles how he and the company’s leadership team used employee engagement as a business strategy to impart leadership lessons to senior leaders, HR professionals, and people managers.

In 2020, Kronos completed a merger with Ultimate Software to create UKG, and Ain became the chairman and chief executive officer of the combined company.

Ain retired as CEO of UKG in July 2022 and transitioned to executive chair.

== Affiliations ==
Ain serves on the board of trustees of his alma mater, Hamilton College. He is on the board of trustees of Boston's Beth Israel Deaconess Medical Center. He is on the board of directors of Combined Jewish Philanthropies of Greater Boston (CJP).

== Honors ==
Ain has been awarded the Ernst & Young's Entrepreneur of the Year award, the Massachusetts High Technology Council's Ray Stata Leadership and Innovation Award, and the Massachusetts Technology Leadership Council's CEO of the Year Award.
