= My Dentist =

American chain of dental clinics

My Dentist, Inc.
- Industry: Dentistry
- Founded: Oklahoma City, Oklahoma, U.S. (1983)
- Headquarters: Oklahoma City, Oklahoma
- Area served: Oklahoma, Texas, Missouri, Arkansas, Kansas
- Key people: Rodney Pat Steffen, Founder; Kevin Offel, CEO
- Services: Dental Care services
- Website: www.mydentistinc.com

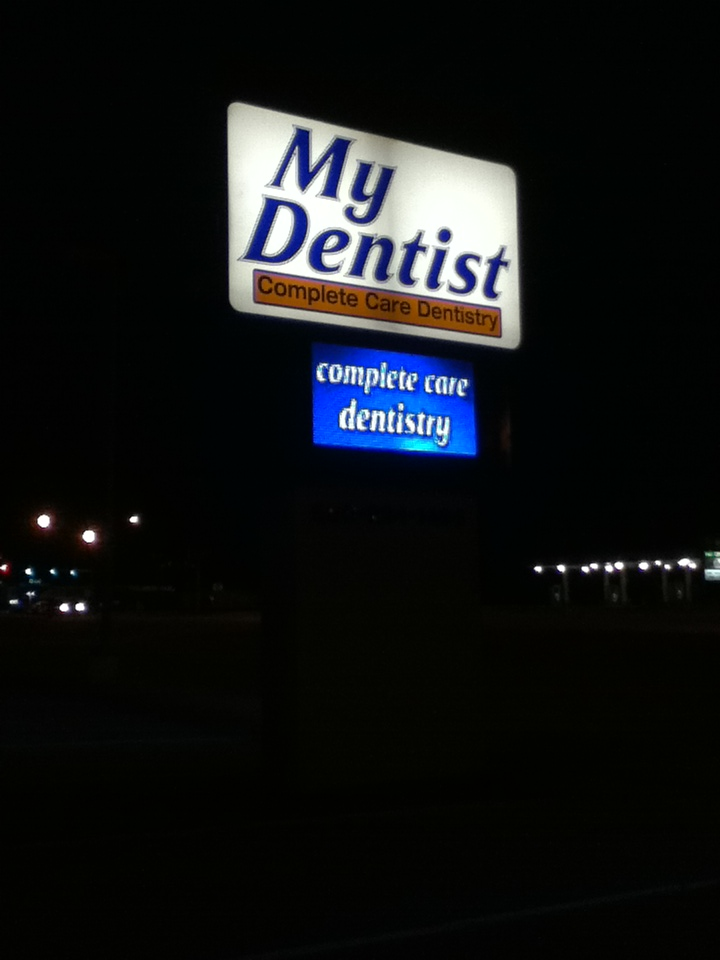
My Dentist in Enid, Oklahoma

My Dentist is a chain of dental clinics headquartered in Oklahoma City, Oklahoma. Founded in 1983 by Dr. Rodney Pat Steffen as Advanced Dental, the company now has 37 locations throughout Oklahoma, Missouri, Texas, Kansas, and Arkansas.

== History ==
My Dentist began in 1983 when Dr. Rodney Pat Steffen (July 26, 1952 - Aug 25, 2012) opened his first clinic in Oklahoma City. Dr. Steffen was born in Sioux Falls, South Dakota, and raised in Crofton, Nebraska. He was a 1977 graduate of the Dental School at the University of Nebraska, who settled in Oklahoma after being stationed at Tinker Air Force Base while serving as a Captain in the U.S. Air Force.

== Expansion ==
The company expanded in 2002 to include clinics in other states, and by 2005 had changed its name from Advanced Dental to MyDentist.

== Procedures ==
The company provides dental care including orthodontics, endodontics, oral and periodontal surgery, prosthodontics, surgical implants, and full mouth rehabilitation services.

== See also ==
- Comfort Dental
- Midwest Dental
