= Friedman Fleischer & Lowe =

American private equity firm

FFL Partners, LLC
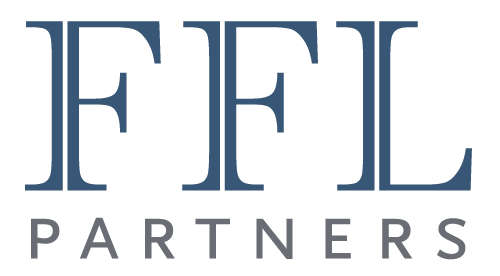
- Formerly: Friedman Fleischer & Lowe
- Type: Private
- Industry: Private Equity
- Founded: 1997; 29 years ago
- Founders: Tully Friedman, Spencer Fleischer, David Lowe, Christopher Masto
- Headquarters: San Francisco, California, United States
- Products: Leveraged buyout, Growth capital
- Total assets: $4.6 billion
- Number of employees: 30+ (2015)
- Website: www.fflpartners.com

FFL Partners, previously known as Friedman Fleischer & Lowe, is an American private equity firm, founded in 1997 by Tully Friedman, Spencer Fleischer, David Lowe, and Christopher Masto. The firm makes investments primarily through leveraged buyouts and growth capital investments and is focused on investing in the U.S. middle-market.

FFL has focused its efforts on several core target industries including healthcare services, financial services, business services, and consumer products. FFL is based in San Francisco and employs over 20 investment professionals. Since inception, FFL has raised approximately $4.6 billion of investor commitments.

== History ==
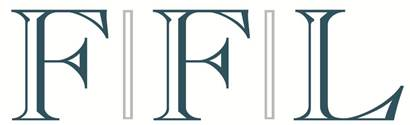
Former company logo

FFL was founded in 1997 by Tully Friedman, together with Spencer Fleischer, David Lowe, and Christopher Masto. Prior to founding FFL, in 1984, Tully Friedman had co-founded Hellman & Friedman, one of the largest private equity firms globally, with Warren Hellman. In contrast to Hellman & Friedman, FFL focuses on smaller, middle market deals.

Spencer Fleischer, was a former member of Morgan Stanley's Investment Banking Operating Committee and the Head of Investment Banking in Asia, Head of Corporate Finance for Europe, Head of UK Corporate Finance, Head of Investment Banking in Los Angeles, and Head of Corporate Finance in San Francisco. David Lowe was chairman and CEO of medical equipment maker ADAC Laboratories. Christopher Masto was a Bain & Company consultant and previously an investment banker at Morgan Stanley.

== Investment holdings ==
FFL invests through a series of private equity funds (structured as limited partnerships), and its investors include a variety of pension funds, endowments, and other institutional investors.

The firm's first private equity fund, Friedman Fleischer & Lowe Capital Partners closed in September 1999 with $333 million of investor commitments. Almost five years later, the firm completed raising $811 million of investor commitments for its second fund, Friedman Fleischer & Lowe Capital Partners II in June 2004. In 2007, the firm raised its third investment fund, Friedman Fleischer & Lowe Capital Partners III, with $1.5 billion of investor commitments.

The following are among the firm's most notable current and previous portfolio companies:

- CapitalSource
- CHI Overhead Doors
- Church's Chicken
- Discovery Foods
- Geovera
- Guardian Home Care
- Korn/Ferry
- Midwest Dental
- Milestone AV Technologies
- Tempur-Pedic
- WellStreet
- Wilton Re

== Rankings ==
HEC-Dow Jones's Private Equity Performance Ranking lists the world's top private equity firms in terms of aggregate performance and listed FFL for three years:

- Ranked #1 in 2012
- Ranked #2 in 2011
- Ranked #11 in 2010

== People ==
FFL's team consists of experienced professionals with diverse backgrounds in operational and strategic management, investment banking, private equity investing, and consulting. The firm's principals have invested over $2.5 billion in over 50 companies and have over 100 years of collective experience as investors, senior operating executives, and advisors.

Investment Principals

- Tully M. Friedman: Hellman & Friedman (co-founder); Salomon Brothers (managing director)
- Spencer Fleischer: Morgan Stanley (Member of Investment Banking Operating Committee & Managing Director)
- Chris Masto: Bain & Company; Morgan Stanley
- Rajat Duggal: Bain Capital; Kirkland & Ellis; Deloitte & Touche
- Nancy Graham Ford: Thomas H. Lee Partners; Goldman Sachs
- Aaron S. Money: DB Capital; Chase Securities
- Cas Schneller: GTCR; William Blair
- John Tudor: Bain Capital; Monitor Company

Operating Partners

- Robert A. Eckert
- Bob Keegan: Goodyear Tire (Chairman & CEO); Kodak (President, Consumer Imaging); Avery Dennison (Global Strategy Officer)
- Jeff Lane: Boise Inc. (Senior Vice President & General Manager); McKinsey & Company (managing director)
- Rick Lenny: The Hershey Company (chairman, President & CEO); Nabisco Biscuit Company (President); Pillsbury North America (President)
- John Roach: Builders FirstSource (chairman, CEO and Founder); Fibreboard Corporation (chairman, President & CEO); Johns Manville (CFO); Unidare US (Executive Chairman & CEO)
- Jack Scott: Heidrick and Struggles (Managing Partner); Korn/Ferry (Partner)

== See also ==
- List of venture capital firms
