= John Delaney (Maryland politician) =

American businessman and politician (born 1963)

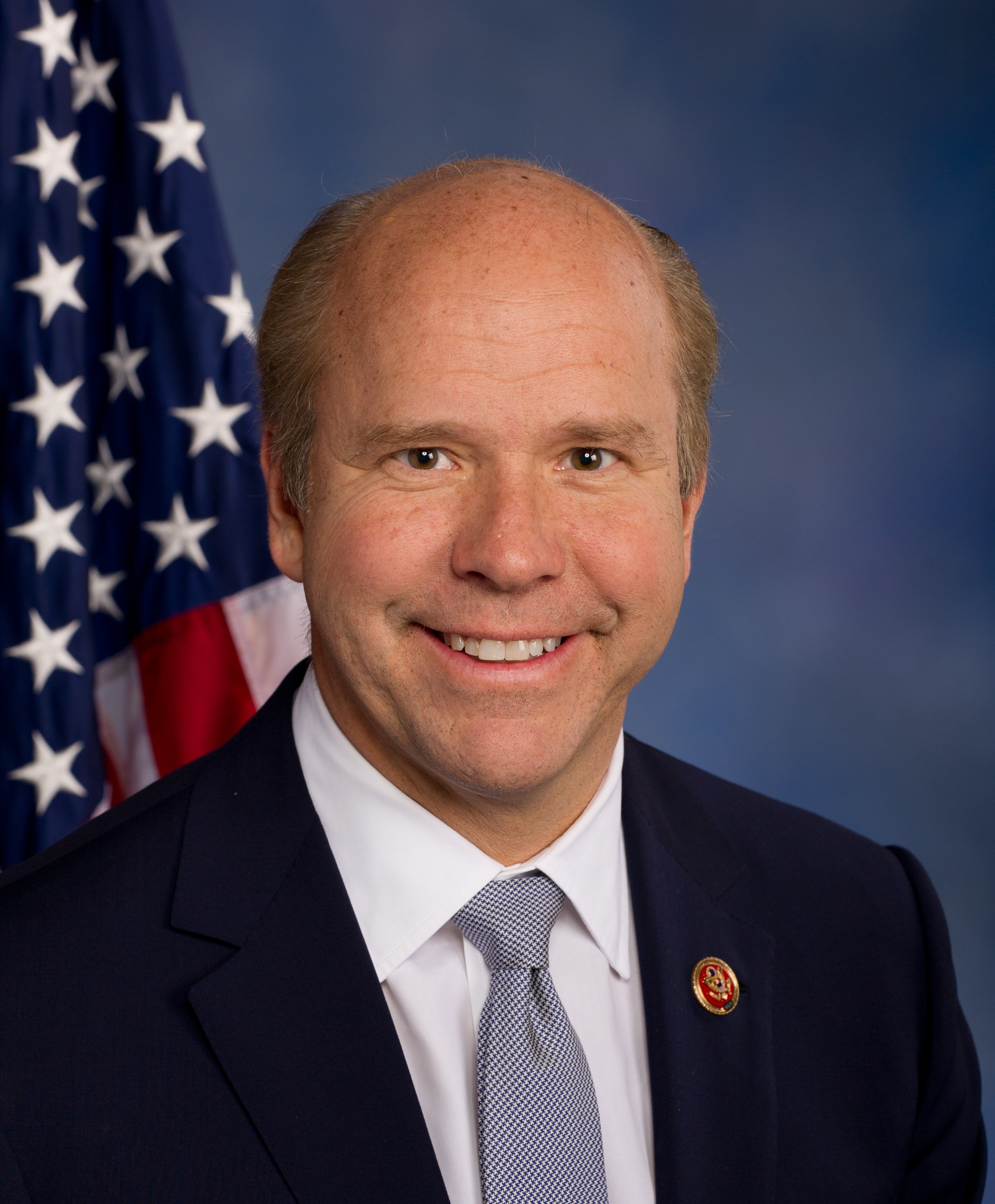
- Official portrait, 2013

Member of the U.S. House of Representatives from Maryland's 6th district
- In office January 3, 2013 – January 3, 2019
- Preceded by: Roscoe Bartlett
- Succeeded by: David Trone

Personal details
- Born: John Kevin Delaney; April 16, 1963 (age 63) Wood-Ridge, New Jersey, U.S.
- Party: Democratic
- Spouse: April McClain (m. 1989)
- Children: 4
- Relatives: John Rowe (uncle)
- Education: Columbia University (BA); Georgetown University (JD)
- Website: Official website

John Kevin Delaney (born April 16, 1963) is an American businessman, politician, and former attorney who was the United States representative for Maryland's 6th congressional district from 2013 to 2019. He is the founder and chairman of Forbright Bank and was a candidate in the 2020 Democratic presidential primaries.

In 2017, Delaney was named one of the World’s 50 Greatest Leaders by Fortune magazine. By the time he turned 40 in 2003, Delaney had founded and led two New York Stock Exchange listed financial services companies – HealthCare Financial Partners and CapitalSource. In 2012, Delaney stepped down from his role as Chairman and CEO of CapitalSource Inc to pursue public office.

On July 28, 2017, Delaney became the first Democrat to announce his run for president in 2020. Delaney did not run for re-election to Congress in 2018, choosing to focus on his presidential campaign. In November 2018, fellow Democrat David Trone was elected to succeed Delaney in Congress, and subsequently endorsed him for President in 2020. Delaney suspended his campaign on January 31, 2020, citing low poll numbers and wanting to avoid pulling support from other candidates. He later endorsed Joe Biden for president. He is the husband of U.S. congresswoman April McClain Delaney, who currently represents his former district.

== Early life and education ==
Delaney grew up in Wood-Ridge, New Jersey, the son of Elaine (Rowe), and Jack Delaney, an electrician. He is the nephew of former Aetna CEO John Rowe. He is of three quarters Irish and one quarter English descent. Delaney spent part of his youth working at his father's construction sites.

Delaney graduated from Bergen Catholic High School. Scholarships from his father's labor union (IBEW Local 164) as well as the American Legion, VFW, and the Lions Club helped Delaney attend college; he earned a B.A. degree from Columbia University in 1985, and a J.D. degree from Georgetown University Law Center in 1988.

== Business career ==
Delaney co-founded two companies that were publicly traded on the New York Stock Exchange. He won the Ernst & Young Entrepreneur of the Year Award in 2004.

In 1993, Delaney co-founded Health Care Financial Partners (HCFP), to make loans available to smaller-sized health care service providers said to be ignored by larger banks. HCFP went public in 1996, and its stock began trading on the New York Stock Exchange in 1998. Health Care Financial Partners was acquired by Heller Financial for three times its IPO price in 1999.

In 2000, Delaney co-founded CapitalSource, a commercial lender headquartered in Chevy Chase, Maryland; the company provided capital to roughly 5,000 small and mid-size businesses before his departure. At the time of its founding, CapitalSource was the most highly capitalized private equity-backed start-up in history. In 2010, while Delaney was CEO, CapitalSource was awarded a Bank Enterprise Award from the Community Development Financial Institutions Fund by the U.S. Treasury Department for its investment in low-income and economically distressed communities. In 2005, CapitalSource was named one of Washingtonian magazine's best places to work for its company culture and employee benefits.

CapitalSource continued to be publicly traded on the NYSE after Delaney's election, making him the only former CEO of a publicly traded company to serve in the 113th United States Congress. In 2014, the lender merged with PacWest Bancorp. In total, Delaney’s companies made over $30 billion of loans to small and mid-sized companies.

== U.S. House of Representatives ==
=== Election ===
==== 2012 ====
After redistricting following the 2010 census, Delaney decided to run for the newly redrawn 6th district against 10-term Republican incumbent Roscoe Bartlett. The district had long been a Republican stronghold, but it had been significantly reconfigured. The Maryland General Assembly shifted much of heavily Republican Carroll County and the more rural sections of Frederick County into the heavily Democratic 8th district. It also shifted Republican-tilting sections of Harford and Baltimore counties, as well as another section of Carroll, into the already heavily Republican 1st district. Taking their place was a heavily Democratic spur of western Montgomery County previously in the 8th District. The redrawn district's share of Montgomery County ended just two blocks from Delaney's home in Potomac. The redrawn district, the state's second-largest, included nearly the entire western portion of the state, but the bulk of its vote came from the outer suburbs of Washington, D.C.

On paper, this dramatically altered the district's demographics, turning it from a heavily Republican district into a Democratic-leaning district. While John McCain carried the 6th with 57 percent of the vote in 2008, Barack Obama would have carried the new 6th with 56 percent. The Montgomery County share of the district has three times as many people as the rest of the district combined.

The shifts were quite controversial, as Republicans accused Democrats of shifting district boundaries in their favor, and former Governor Martin O'Malley later admitted the redrawn districts would favor Democrats. "That was my hope," O'Malley told attorneys in a deposition. "It was also my intent to create ... a district where the people would be more likely to elect a Democrat than a Republican."

During the primary, Delaney was endorsed by former President Bill Clinton, U.S. Congresswoman Donna Edwards, Comptroller Peter Franchot, The Washington Post, and the Gazette.

On April 3, 2012, Delaney won the five-candidate Democratic primary field with 54% of the vote. The next closest opponent, State Senator Robert J. Garagiola, received 29% of the vote, 25 points behind Delaney.

In the November 6, 2012 general election, Delaney defeated Bartlett by 59%–38%, a 21-point margin. He won the Montgomery County share of the district by almost 56,000 votes, accounting for almost all of the overall margin of 58,900 votes.

==== 2013 ====
In 2013, Delaney was elected co-president of his Freshman class of 85 representatives.

==== 2014 ====
Delaney faced a closer-than-expected contest for reelection against Dan Bongino, the Republican candidate in 2012 for U.S. Senate from Maryland. While Delaney won just one of the district's five counties, that one county was Montgomery, which he carried by over 20,500 votes. Delaney ultimately won the race by just over 2,200 votes.

==== 2016 ====
Delaney won a third term in 2016, taking 56 percent of the vote to Republican Amie Hoeber's 40 percent.

=== Tenure ===
Delaney introduced legislation to end partisan gerrymandering. The Open Our Democracy Act of 2017 would appoint independent redistricting commissions nationwide to end partisan gerrymandering, make Election Day a federal holiday, and create an open top-two primary system.

Delaney was ranked as the 53rd most bipartisan member of the U.S. House of Representatives during the 114th United States Congress (and the most bipartisan member of the U.S. House of Representatives from Maryland) in the Bipartisan Index created by The Lugar Center and the McCourt School of Public Policy that ranks members of the United States Congress by their degree of bipartisanship (by measuring the frequency each member's bills attract co-sponsors from the opposite party and each member's co-sponsorship of bills by members of the opposite party). In 2015, a similar ranking by the nonpartisan site GovTrack ranked Delaney third highest for bipartisanship among all House Democrats.

=== Committee assignments ===
- Committee on Financial Services
  - Subcommittee on Financial Institutions and Consumer Credit
  - Subcommittee on Oversight and Investigations
- Joint Economic Committee

=== Caucus memberships ===
- Artificial Intelligence Caucus (co-founder)
- New Democrat Coalition
- Congressional Arts Caucus
- Congressional Asian Pacific American Caucus
- Congressional NextGen 9-1-1 Caucus
- Climate Solutions Caucus

== 2020 presidential bid ==
Logo for Delaney's presidential campaign

Despite a rumored bid to run against governor Larry Hogan in 2018, Delaney bypassed the 2018 elections altogether. On July 28, 2017, he announced his run for president in 2020 in a Washington Post op-ed.

Delaney favored universal health coverage and proposed a public plan that would cover all Americans under the age of 65 (while leaving Medicare for those over 65 untouched). He opposed Medicare-for-all, arguing that advocacy for the policy would help incumbent President Donald Trump get re-elected. During a June 2019 debate, Delaney claimed that hospitals will be shuttered under Medicare for All; Politifact, the Washington Post fact-checker, and Kaiser Health News all found this claim to be false and unsubstantiated.

Delaney dropped out of the presidential race on January 31, 2020. He cited his failure to gain traction in polls and wanting to avoid pulling support from other moderate candidates as reasons behind the suspension of his campaign. On March 6, 2020, he endorsed Joe Biden.

== Political positions ==
Delaney has been frequently referred to as a "moderate". However, he does not entirely identify as such. Delaney has remarked,

People have a hard time labeling me. Some of the things they hear me talking about are on the total progressive or liberal end of the spectrum, and in other ways I'm kind of a solutions-oriented moderate who wants to get things done.

However, statements made since then suggest he has embraced the moderate label. Appearing on PBS NewsHour on May 8, 2019, Delaney remarked, "I am probably the most moderate candidate" in the field of 2020 Democratic presidential candidates.

He has received the top score of 100 from the Human Rights Campaign for his support of equality-related legislation, with him stating "No one should be discriminated against because of who they are or who they love" in response to this recognition.

Delaney has said he would support increasing the corporate tax rate from 21 percent to 23 percent "to raise about $200 billion for infrastructure".

== Personal life ==
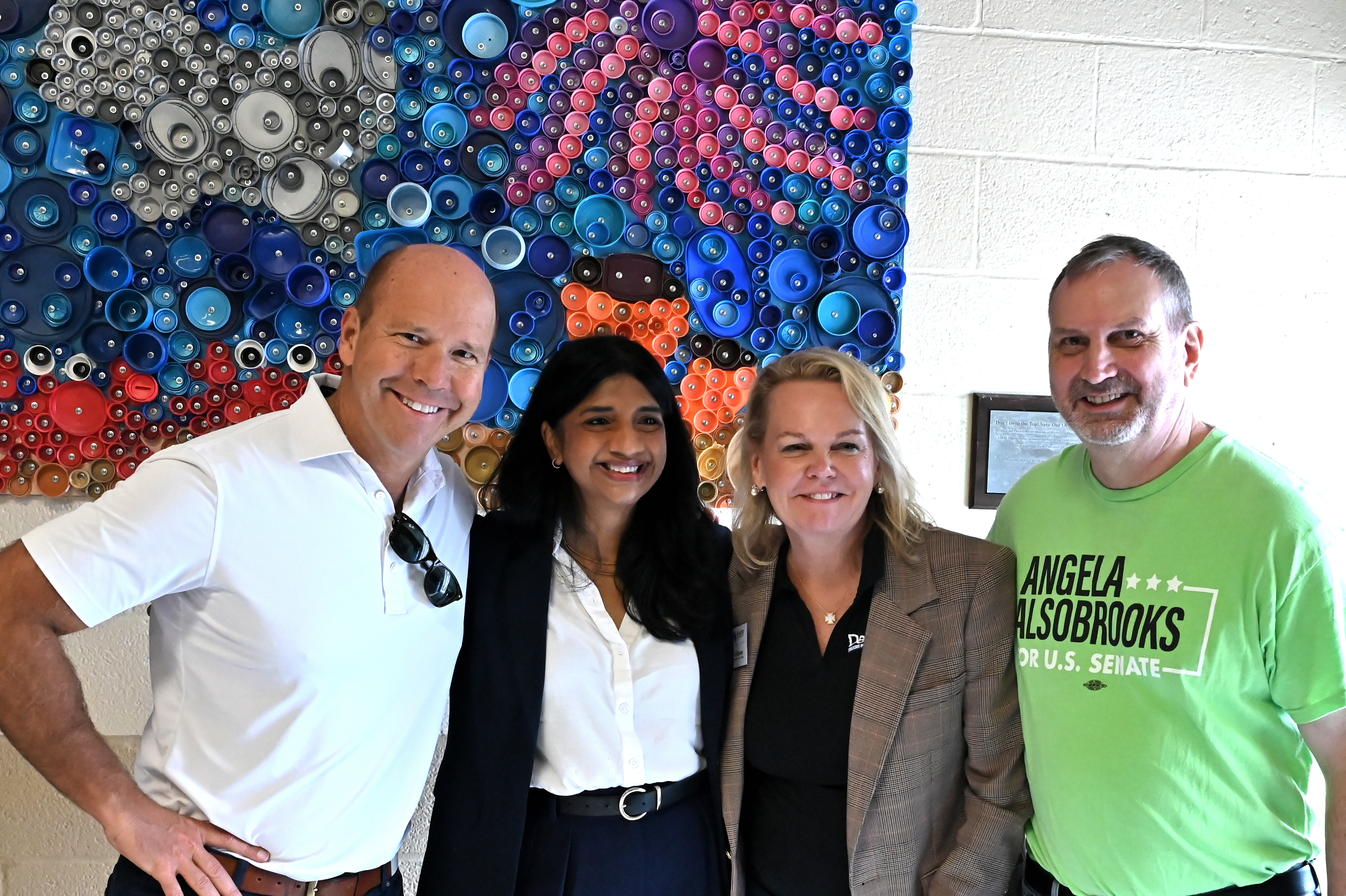
The Delaneys with Maryland lieutenant governor Aruna Miller and her husband, 2024

Delaney and his wife April (née McClain) met at Georgetown University Law Center. They married in Sun Valley, Idaho in 1989, and moved to the Washington metropolitan area after graduating. Together, they live in Potomac, Maryland and have four daughters; Summer, Brooke, Lily, and Grace. April served as deputy administrator of the National Telecommunications and Information Administration from 2022 to 2023 before her election to Congress from Maryland's 6th congressional district in 2024. Two of Delaney's four daughters attend Northwestern University while his oldest daughter, Summer, worked as a video journalist and multimedia reporter for Tribune Media and WPIX (PIX11) News.

Delaney is Catholic, and has said that "to some extent" his faith has guided his "social justice orientation". He was also a member of the Board of Directors of several organizations: St. Patrick's Episcopal Day School (Chairman), Georgetown University, National Symphony Orchestra, and the International Center for Research on Women.

U.S. House of Representatives
Preceded by Roscoe Bartlett	Member of the U.S. House of Representatives from Maryland's 6th congressional district 2013–2019	Succeeded by David Trone
U.S. order of precedence (ceremonial)
Preceded by Tom McMillen as Former U.S. Representative	Order of precedence of the United States as Former U.S. Representative	Succeeded by Anthony Brown as Former U.S. Representative
