= LiveView =

LiveView might mean:

- Live preview in digital cameras
- Sony Ericsson LiveView
- LiveView Technologies, a video surveillance company
