= UKG (disambiguation) =

UKG (Ultimate Kronos Group) is an American multinational technology company.

UKG may also stand for:

- UK garage, a British genre of electronic dance music
- Umagang Kay Ganda, a defunct Filipino morning news show
- UK Government, Government of the United Kingdom
