= LVT =

LVT may refer to:

- Land value tax, or location value tax, a levy on the value of land
- Landing Vehicle Tracked, an amphibious military vehicle
- Leasehold valuation tribunal, in England
- LogoVisual thinking, a thinking methodology
- Lars von Trier, a Danish film director and screenwriter
- Luxury vinyl tile, a flooring material
- LiveView Technologies, a video surveillance company
