= Hummingbird Ltd. =

Computer software company

Hummingbird
- Company type: Subsidiary of public company
- Industry: Computer software
- Founded: Toronto, Ontario (1984)
- Fate: Acquired by Open Text Corporation
- Headquarters: Toronto, Ontario, Canada
- Key people: Barry Litwin, Fred Sorkin (Chairman of the Board)
- Revenue: ▲$236.1 million USD (2005)
- Net income: ▼$22.36 million USD (2005)
- Number of employees: 1500+ (2005)
- Website: www.opentext.com/about/brands/hummingbird

Hummingbird Ltd. (previously NASDAQ: HUMC, TSX: HUM) is a subsidiary of OpenText and is a provider of enterprise software products including Exceed. Initially founded as a consulting business in 1984, Hummingbird moved into the connectivity market. Its enterprise content management (ECM) software focuses on the management of the life cycle of enterprise content.

Hummingbird has 40 offices worldwide. Customers include IBM, NASA, Morgan Stanley, Boeing, The Walt Disney Company, and the Government of Canada.

== History ==
Hummingbird was one of many vendors of X server and Unix connectivity solutions for Windows-based computers, with its eXceed product being regarded as "an excellent all-round product" in the form of eXceed/W at version 3.3.3 in one 1994 review. The product provided an X server alongside other traditional TCP/IP-based applications such as FTP and telnet clients, supporting the wide range of TCP/IP stacks available for Windows at that time, requiring a minimum system specification of Windows 3.0 running on an Intel 80286-based PC with 2 MB of RAM. Version 4.0 of eXceed became available in 1994, and was released for Windows NT in 1995. A survey of the PC X server market by International Data Corporation for 1993 portrayed Hummingbird as the market leader with a reported 32% market share.

Acquisition of PCDOCS was one of the most important steps of the company in the way of formation as an ECM-oriented company. DOCS Open product of PCDOCS Inc. became Hummingbird DOCSFusion and DM - a part of Hummingbird document management system (a part of Hummingbird Enterprise Suite). The product still exists in OpenText products after rebranding with new name as eDOCS DM. In November 2012 OpenText launched the new v5.3.1 version with full support of Windows 8 and Windows Server 2012.

=== Mergers, acquisitions, IPOs ===
- 1984 - Hummingbird founded.
- 1993 - Completes $45 million CAD IPO of common shares in Canada, on the Toronto Stock Exchange.
- 1994 - Completes US$34.5 million additional and secondary offering of common shares on NASDAQ.
- 1995 - Acquires Beame & Whiteside Software Inc., developer of NFS products.
- 1996 - Purchased naming rights to the O'Keefe Centre, now known as Meridian Hall.
- 1997 - Acquires TN3270 and TN5250 terminal emulation software from McGill University and PolarSoft Inc. in Canada.
- 1998
  - Acquires business intelligence solutions vendor, Andyne Computing Ltd.
  - Acquires Datenrevision of Hamburg, Germany, a software consulting and distribution company.
- 1999
  - Acquires Leonard's Logics SA, of Paris, France, makers of Genio, a data transformation and exchange tool (ETL) for deployment of data marts.
  - Acquires PC DOCS Group International
- 2000 - Ventured into India, by tying up with Dess Computers as its systems integrator for Hummingbird products in India.
- 2000 - Acquires imaging technology from Diamond Head Software Inc.
- 2001 - Acquires UK company, PeopleDoc.
- 2003
  - Acquires legal practice management firms LegalKEY Technologies and Kramer Lee & Associates.
  - Acquires Valid Information Systems.
  - Acquires Key Automation Nederland B.V. and its affiliate Dispro B.V., distributors and integrators of document management solutions in the Netherlands and Benelux.
- 2005 - Hummingbird acquires RedDot Solutions, rounding out its integrated ECM offering.
- 2006 - Hummingbird acquired by Open Text for $489 million. Hummingbird informed Texas Guaranteed Student Loan Company that it had lost a piece of equipment—albeit password protected—containing the unencrypted personal data (names and social security numbers) of an estimated 1.3 million Texas student loan recipients. The company's board of directors agreed to be sold to Symphony Technology Group, but following a hostile bid from Open Text, the board negotiated a deal with its rival and accepted an all-cash US$489 million buy-out from Open Text. Following the close of the deal in October, Open Text announced a 15% global workforce reduction.
- 2008 - Gold Coast City Council rolls Hummingbird out as document management system to 3000+ employees

=== Products ===
- 1990 - Hummingbird Basic and Hummingbird QuickScript
- 1994 - Host Explorer
