= PointClear =

American sales outsourcing company

PointClear, LLC
- Company type: Privately held company LLC
- Industry: Sales
- Founded: 1997; 29 years ago
- Founder: Dan McDade
- Headquarters: Norcross, Georgia, United States
- Area served: United States
- Key people: Dan McDade (CEO & Founder), Karla Blalock (Chief Operating Officer)
- Services: Prospect development, lead generation, outsourced prospecting
- Website: pointclear.com

PointClear is an American sales company that works with business-to-business companies in lead generation and outsourced prospecting.

It uses a multiple-touch system, meaning that it contacts leads repeatedly via phone, voicemail, and email. The company is headquartered in Norcross, Georgia.

== History ==
The company was founded by Dan McDade in 1997.

== Clients ==
PointClear's clients have included CenterBeam, D&B, Ingenix (a subsidiary of UnitedHealth Group), LXE, Microsoft, and Ultimate Software.
