= Robert A. Eckert =

American businessman (born 1954)

- Born: 1954 (age 71–72); Elmhurst, Illinois, U.S.
- Education: University of Arizona; Northwestern University
- Known for: chairman and CEO of Mattel, 2000–11; CEO of Kraft Foods, 1997–2000
- Title: operating partner, Friedman Fleischer & Lowe
- Spouses: Kathie Eckert; Lisa Marie Bongiovanni
- Children: 4

Robert A. Eckert (born 1954) is an American businessman, chairman and CEO of Mattel from 2000 to 2011, CEO of Kraft Foods from 1997 to 2000, and an operating partner with the private equity firm Friedman Fleischer & Lowe.

== Early life ==
Eckert was born in 1954 in Elmhurst, Illinois. He received a bachelor's degree in business administration from the University of Arizona in 1976, where he was a member of Sigma Phi Epsilon; and an MBA in marketing and finance from Northwestern University in 1977.

== Career ==
Eckert started a 23-year career with Kraft Foods in 1977, rising to president and chief executive officer (CEO) in October 1997.

In 2000, Eckert joined Mattel as chairman and CEO, and remained as CEO until December 2011. He retired at the end of 2011, and was succeeded by Bryan G. Stockton who had been chief operating officer and chairman until December 2012.

In 2004, under Eckert's leadership, Mattel began a seven-year legal war against tiny, California-based MGA Entertainment. In a surprise defeat, a jury decided that MGA Entertainment was the rightful owner of the once-billion dollar line of Bratz dolls. A BMO Capital Markets analyst said the failure to settle will go down as a “tremendously bad decision” by Mattel management. “It means they wasted $400 million or so of shareholder money to get zero return,” he said.

In 2014, Eckert joined the private equity firm Friedman Fleischer & Lowe as an operating partner.

He is a non-executive director of Levi Strauss and McDonald's since 2003, Amgen since 2012, and Uber since 2020. Since May 2021, he is the board chair of Levi Strauss.

== Personal life ==
Eckert was married to Kathie, and they had four children. In June 2017, Eckert and his wife sold their Park Tower condominium for a little over $2.92 million.

On June 1, 2019, Eckert married Lisa Marie Bongiovanni, a former Mattel communications executive.
