= Cross Point (Lowell, Massachusetts) =

Office complex in Lowell, Massachusetts, United States

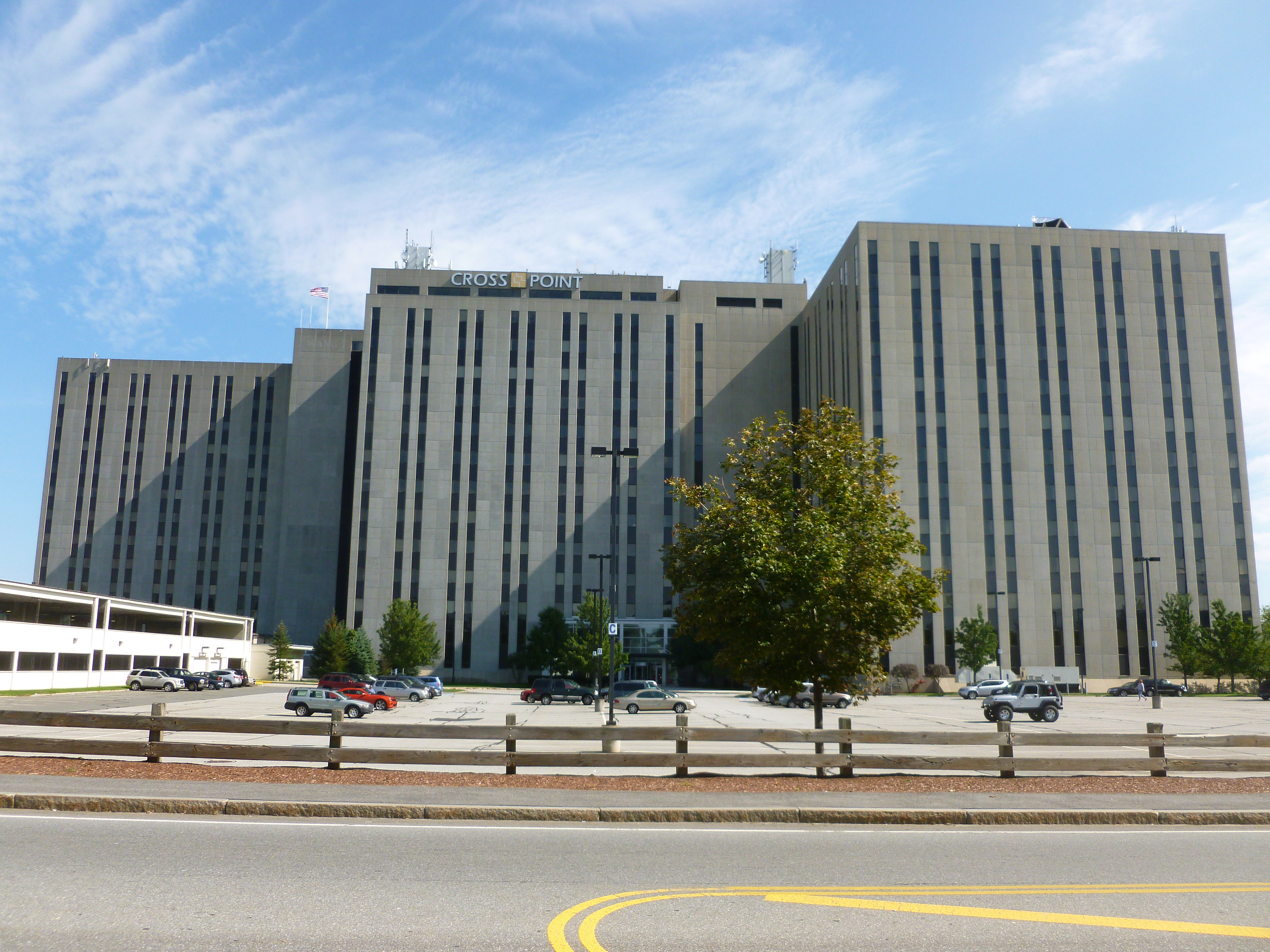
- Interactive map of the Cross Point area

General information
- Status: Completed
- Type: Class A office building
- Location: Lowell, Massachusetts, US, 900 Chelmsford Street Lowell, Massachusetts 01851
- Coordinates: 42°36′53″N 71°19′29″W
- Owner: Yale Properties USA; Divco West; Public Sector Pension Investment Board (Canada)

Height
- Height: 168.93 feet (51.49 m)

Cross Point is an office complex in Lowell, Massachusetts. Formerly named Wang Towers, it is a local landmark, dominating the busy intersection of Interstate 495 (the Boston outer ring road) and U.S. Route 3. It is the third-tallest building in Lowell, after Three River Place and the Kenneth R. Fox Student Union at UMass Lowell.

The complex, consisting of three interconnected cement-clad 12-story towers and other buildings totaling over 1,200,000 square feet (110,000 m^{2}) situated on 15 acres (6.1 ha), was built by original sole tenant Wang Laboratories as its new world headquarters.

Construction began in 1980, and it was completed in stages at a cost of US$60,000,000 (about $200 million in current dollars). The buildings served as a demonstration of the rise of Wang Labs and the Boston-area computer technology industry generally, and later as a sign of the rapid fall of the company and industry: Wang Labs entered bankruptcy in 1992, and the property was sold at bankruptcy auction in 1994 for a tiny fraction of its construction cost – $525,000 (about $1.14 million in current dollars) – in 1994, to Louis Pellegrine, fronting for One Industrial Avenue Corp (OIAC). OIAC was a partnership of principals Christopher Kelly and Luis Alvarado, along with Brian Kelly, Daniel Doherty and investor Geometry Partners.

OIAC renovated the towers (with the help of tax breaks and a $2.2 million letter of credit from the City of Lowell) and sold them in 1998 to San Francisco–based Yale Properties USA and Blackstone Real Estate Advisors, reportedly for over $100 million. The towers acquired new tenants, but business was hurt by the 2000–2001 bursting of the "dot-com bubble", and it was described as being, by 2005, a "ghost town" with an occupancy rate of about 50%.

Yale Properties bought out Blackstone's share in 2005; in the same year San Diego–based Divco West Properties bought an interest in the property. By 2007 the occupancy rate was back up to about 90%, with major tenants such as Motorola moving in. Yale actively shopped the property, but a 2007 deal to sell it for about $180 million to a consortium led by Davis Marcus Partners fell through. The real estate crash beginning in 2007 put severe strain on the property's finances, but Yale and Divco West (along with Canada's Public Sector Pension Investment Board) retained ownership. In 2012 the towers were about 70% filled and Colliers International was hired to boost occupancy.

The towers were sold to CP Associates LLC for $100 million in 2014.

One of the largest office lease relocation transactions in Greater Boston happened when Kronos Incorporated signed a 500,000 square-foot global headquarters office lease at Cross Point in 2016. This move makes it one of the largest employers in Lowell and the largest tenant at Cross Point with 1,500 employees on a total of 16 floors. CrossPoint’s ownership team and Kronos (renamed UKG after a 2020 merger) planned to spend more than $40 million on the design and build of a completely modernized facility.

== Notes ==
1. Some sources give 12 or 13 as the number of storeys. Yale Properties gives 14.
2. Many sources give "$50 to $60 million" as the construction cost. The New York Times gives $60 million.
