= Banc of California =

Banking and financial services company

Banc of California, Inc.
- Type: Public
- Traded as: NYSE: BANC; S&P 600 component
- Industry: Financial services
- Founded: 1941; 85 years ago (as Rohr Employees Federal Credit Union)
- Headquarters: Los Angeles, California, United States
- Key people: Jared Wolff (president and CEO)
- Total assets: $38+ billion
- Website: bancofcal.com

Banc of California is an American bank with 80 branches in California, as well as locations in Denver, Colorado, and Durham, North Carolina. The bank is headquartered in Los Angeles, California, with about 2,000 employees nationwide including in New York and Chicago. Banc of California offers a broad range of loan and deposit products and services, focusing on providing banking and treasury management services to small-, middle-market, and venture-backed businesses.

== History ==
Banc of California was founded in 1941 as the Rohr Employees Federal Credit Union, serving employees of the Rohr Aircraft plant in Chula Vista, California. The credit union was renamed the Pacific Trust Federal Credit Union in 1995, which itself was renamed the Pacific Trust Bank in 2000, becoming a mutually owned federal savings bank.

The Pacific Trust Bank was made into a subsidiary of First PacTrust Bancorp Inc. in 2002. First PacTrust Bancorp, Inc. and Beach Business Bank completed their merger in 2012. The company's two banking subsidiaries, Pacific Trust Bank and The Private Bank of California, were merged to form Banc of California in 2013. The bank also hired former Los Angeles mayor Antonio Villaraigosa as a strategic advisor.

Banc of California bought 20 bank branches in Southern California from Popular, Inc., a Puerto Rico-based bank, for $5.4 million in 2014. The move doubled the number of branches the bank owned and brought its assets to $5 billion.

Jared Wolff took over as CEO of Banc of California in March 2019, succeeding Doug Bowers. Bowers had assumed the role in 2017, following founding CEO Steven Sugarman.

Banc of California announced the acquisition of Pacific Mercantile Bank in March 2021 in a transaction valued at $235 million.

=== Merger with PacWest Bancorp ===
In July 2023, a few months after bank runs in regional banks caused a banking crisis, Banc of California agreed to rescue and acquire Pacific Western Bank in an all-stock deal valued at $1.1 billion, aimed at restoring confidence in the bank. As part of the deal, Warburg Pincus and Centerbridge Partners would invest $400 million in the combined company. Wolff was credited with orchestrating the deal, which closed in November 2023, having previously served in several executive roles at Pacific Western Bank from 2002 to 2014.

In 2025, Wolff became President, Chairman and CEO of Banc of California, Inc.

=== Philanthropy & Sponsorships ===
Banc of California has previously been an official sponsor of the USC Trojans and the athletic program of the University of Southern California. The bank was also a major sponsor of Los Angeles FC, a Major League Soccer franchise, including and a 15-year, $100 million deal with the club for the naming rights to their stadium Banc of California Stadium in Los Angeles, which opened in 2018. The naming rights were restructured in 2020.

Banc of California supported the recovery from the January 2025 Southern California Wildfires. A week after the fires began, the bank created the Wildfire Relief & Recovery Fund with a $1 million donation to aid wildfire recovery and rebuilding efforts. In August, these funds were allocated to Steadfast LA, a nonprofit created by Rick Caruso, which supports small businesses in Altadena, Malibu and Pacific Palisades.

The bank also contributed $250,000 to the L.A. Area Chamber's Small Business Disaster Relief Fund, assisting small businesses impacted by crises throughout the region.

=== Awards and Recognition ===
In 2026, Banc of California was named to Newsweek and Plant-A Insights Group's America's Greatest Workplaces list.
