= Forbright Bank =

American private bank headquartered in Maryland

- Formerly: Congressional Bank (2003–2021)
- Company type: Private
- Industry: Financial services
- Founded: 2003
- Headquarters: Chevy Chase, Maryland
- Key people: John Delaney (Chairman); Don Cole (CEO); Chris Lynch (CFO)
- Services: Personal banking, business banking, lending
- AUM: $7 billion
- Number of employees: 500+
- Website: www.forbrightbank.com

Forbright Bank (formerly Congressional Bank) is an FDIC-insured American bank headquartered in Chevy Chase, Maryland. The bank holds over $7 billion in assets. The bank’s offers environmentally conscious online banking and direct lending products. As of 2021, John Delaney leads the company as Executive Chairman.

== History ==
Forbright began operations in 2003 as Congressional Bank, a Maryland-chartered trust company. As Congressional Bank, Forbright acquired American Bank Holdings in 2016. In 2018, Congressional Bank acquired the operating business and a substantial portion of the assets of Alliance Partners LLC, now a wholly owned subsidiary of Forbright Bank that serves as the asset manager for BancAlliance.

In 2021, Congressional Bank acquired The Energy Loan Network, LLC, a residential solar and energy efficiency financing company.

The bank rebranded from Congressional Bank to Forbright Bank in 2022. As part of that rebranding, the bank partnered with the National Park Foundation to support environmental conservation. That same year, the bank announced sustainability-linked financing, including the issuance of a Green bond.

Starting in 2023, the bank expanded its consumer digital products to include online savings and certificate of deposit, especially environmentally oriented deposit products.

In 2025, Forbright acquired the assets of now-bankrupt residential solar provider, Mosaic Inc.

In June 2026, Forbright announced that it was seeking to raise $158 million in an initial public offering. According to its filing with the United States Securities and Exchange Commission, the company plans to market 7.9 million shares for $18 to $20 each, giving Forbright a market value of around $994 million.

== Reception ==
In 2022, U.S. News & World Report named the bank’s Growth Savings account as the 2025 Money Awards Editor’s Choice: Saving Money While Doing Good.

In 2023, the bank was awarded the "Sustainable Bank Badge" by BestCashCow.com.

In 2024, Forbright drew scrutiny from regulators over aspects of its funding model. Law360 reported that the FDIC downgraded Forbright's Community Reinvestment Act (CRA) score examination and compliance. American Banker reported on an FDIC consent order that criticized the bank’s reliance on non-core funding sources, notably brokered deposits. Sources later reported that the bank resolved the supervisory order and that regulators lifted the consent order in 2025.
