= Hellman & Friedman =

American private equity firm

Hellman & Friedman LLC
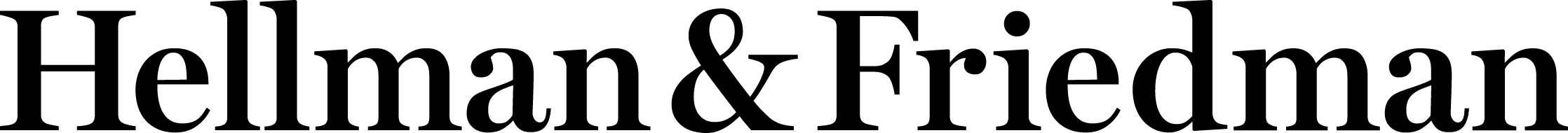

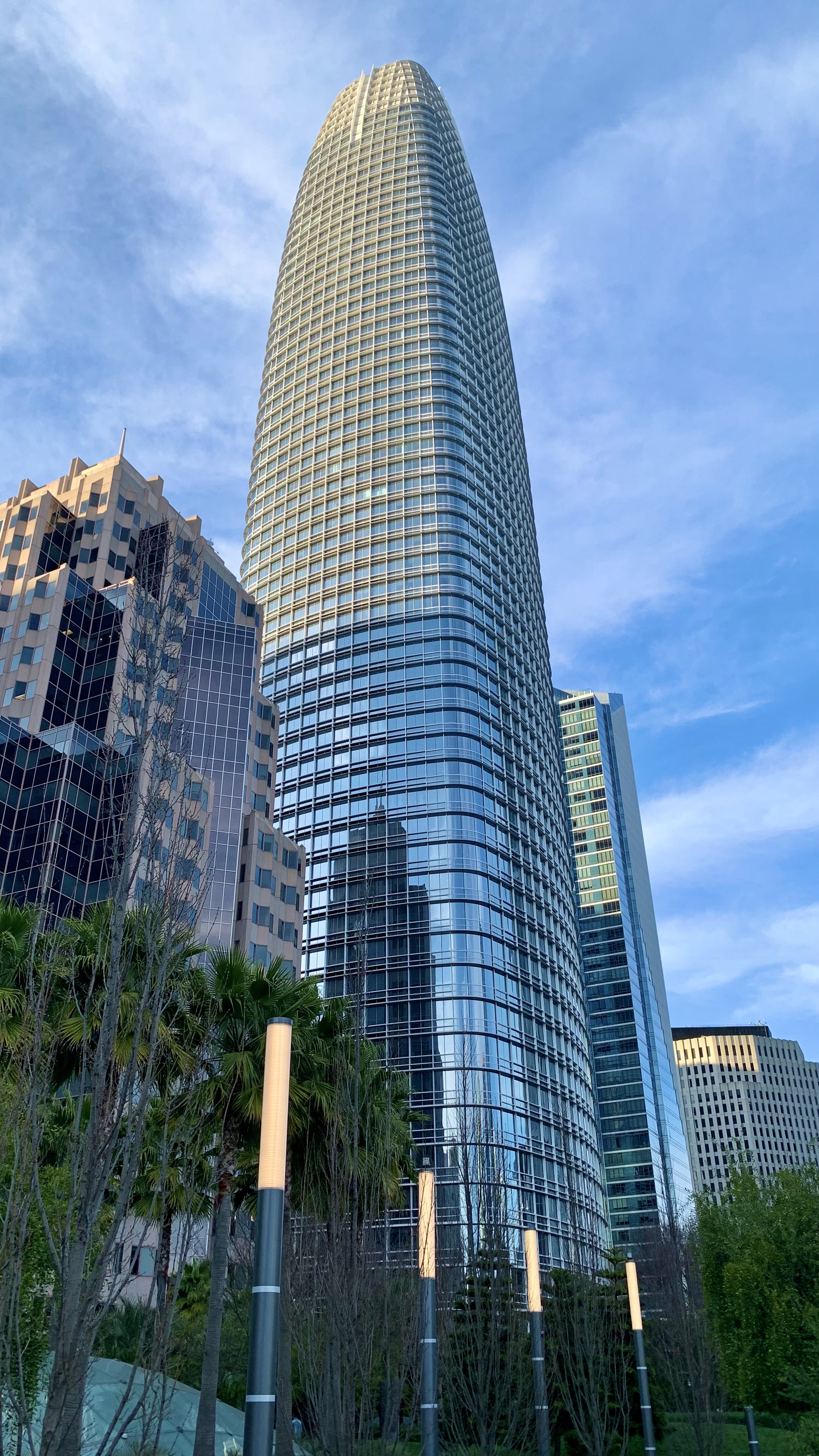
- Headquarters at Salesforce Tower
- Type: Private
- Industry: Private equity
- Founded: 1984; 42 years ago
- Founder: Warren Hellman; Tully Friedman
- Headquarters: Salesforce Tower; San Francisco, California, United States
- Products: Leveraged buyout; Growth capital
- AUM: US$107.5 billion (March 2025)
- Total assets: US$25 billion
- Number of employees: 200+ (2025)
- Website: www.hf.com

Hellman & Friedman (H&F) is an American private equity firm founded in 1984 by Warren Hellman and Tully Friedman that makes investments primarily through leveraged buyouts as well as growth capital investments. It has focused its efforts on several core target industries including media, financial services, professional services and information services.

Headquartered in San Francisco with offices in New York and London, H&F tends to avoid asset intensive or other industrial businesses (e.g., manufacturing, chemicals, transportation). In June 2024, it ranked 13th in Private Equity International's PEI 300 ranking among the world's largest private equity firms.

== History ==
=== Founding ===
Before founding H&F in 1984 alongside Tully Friedman, Warren Hellman worked in investment banking at Lehman Brothers. Later, he became a founding partner of Hellman, Ferri Investment Associates, which, renamed Matrix Partners, is currently one of the most prominent venture capital firms in the U.S.

Meanwhile, Friedman was a former managing director at Salomon Brothers who, in 1997, left the company to found Friedman Fleischer & Lowe, a private equity firm also based in San Francisco.

=== Recent ===
In August 2013, it acquired Canada's largest insurance broker, Hub International, for around $4.4 billion. In March 2014, the firm acquired Renaissance Learning, a firm providing assessment methods such as electronic tests that adapt questions in real time depending on how successfully the student is answering, for $1.1 billion in cash.

In February 2015, it was announced that Hellman & Friedman were putting together a takeover bid for used car company Auto Trader, which could amount to an offer of £2 billion. On May 18, 2017, H&F made a A$2.9 billion bid for Fairfax Media in Australia, starting a bidding war with TPG Group for the company.

In May 2016, H&F agreed to a deal to acquire the healthcare cost management company MultiPlan Inc. for about $7.5 billion. In June 2018, it was announced that Hellman & Friedman were taking a controlling interest in the security monitoring company, SimpliSafe.

In February 2019, it was announced that Hellman & Friedman purchased Ultimate Software for $11 billion, an all-cash transaction. Ultimate Software has since been combined with Kronos Incorporated, and rolled into the brand Ultimate Kronos Group.

In December, Hellman & Friedman acquired AutoScout24, a European automotive digital marketplace, for €2.9 billion from Scout24. In 2020, H&F joined Diligent Corporation's Modern Leadership Initiative and pledged to create five new board roles among its portfolio companies for racially diverse candidates.

In July 2021, it was announced that Hellman & Friedman purchased At Home. In November, H&F and Bain Capital agreed to buy Athenahealth for $17 Billion.

In March 2022, Hellman & Friedman acquired a 7.5% stake in software solutions company Splunk. The stake was valued at $1.4 billion, making it the largest shareholder.

On April 1, 2025, it supported the merger of accounting and consulting firms Baker Tilly and Moss Adams, in a transaction that created one of the largest multidisciplinary professional services firms in the U.S. As part of the deal, H&F made an additional strategic investment in Baker Tilly to support the combined entity's long-term growth.

Also in April, Hellman & Friedman joined CVC Capital Partners in a strategic investment in Mehiläinen, a Finnish private provider of healthcare and social care services. As part of the transaction, Mehiläinen also announced agreements to acquire Romanian healthcare provider Regina Maria and Serbian network MediGroup, expanding its presence in Central and Eastern Europe.

== Notable holdings ==
A core element in H&F's strategy is investing in "growth" opportunities whether in an industry sector or a specific company. H&F invests in a variety of structures, frequently making minority investments with only limited controls. Additionally, H&F has taken a number of unconventional steps to finance and close transactions, including arranging and syndicating the financing for several investments including Getty Images and Goodman Global.

Since closing its sixth private equity fund in 2007, H&F has been active in making new investments:

- DoubleClick
- Goodman Global
- Gartmore
- Texas Genco
- GCM Grosvenor
- Nielsen Company
- Nasdaq
- Internet Brands
- PPD
- UKG
- HUB International Ltd
- Mehiläinen

== Investment funds ==
H&F invests through a series of private equity funds (structured as limited partnerships) and its investors include a variety of pension funds, endowments and other institutional investors:

- 1984 – Hellman & Friedman I
- 1991 – Hellman & Friedman II ($826 million)
- 1995 – Hellman & Friedman III ($1.5 billion)
- 2000 – Hellman & Friedman IV ($2.2 billion)
- 2004 – Hellman & Friedman V ($3.5 billion)
- 2007 – Hellman & Friedman VI ($8.4 billion)
- 2011 – Hellman & Friedman VII ($8.8 billion)
- 2014 – Hellman & Friedman VIII ($10.9 billion)
- 2018 – Hellman & Friedman IX ($16.5 billion)
- 2021 – Hellman & Friedman X ($24.4 billion)
- 2024 – Hellman & Friedman XI ($22.3 billion)

Source: Preqin

== See also ==
- List of venture capital firms
