= HUB International =

North American insurance brokerage

HUB International, Ltd

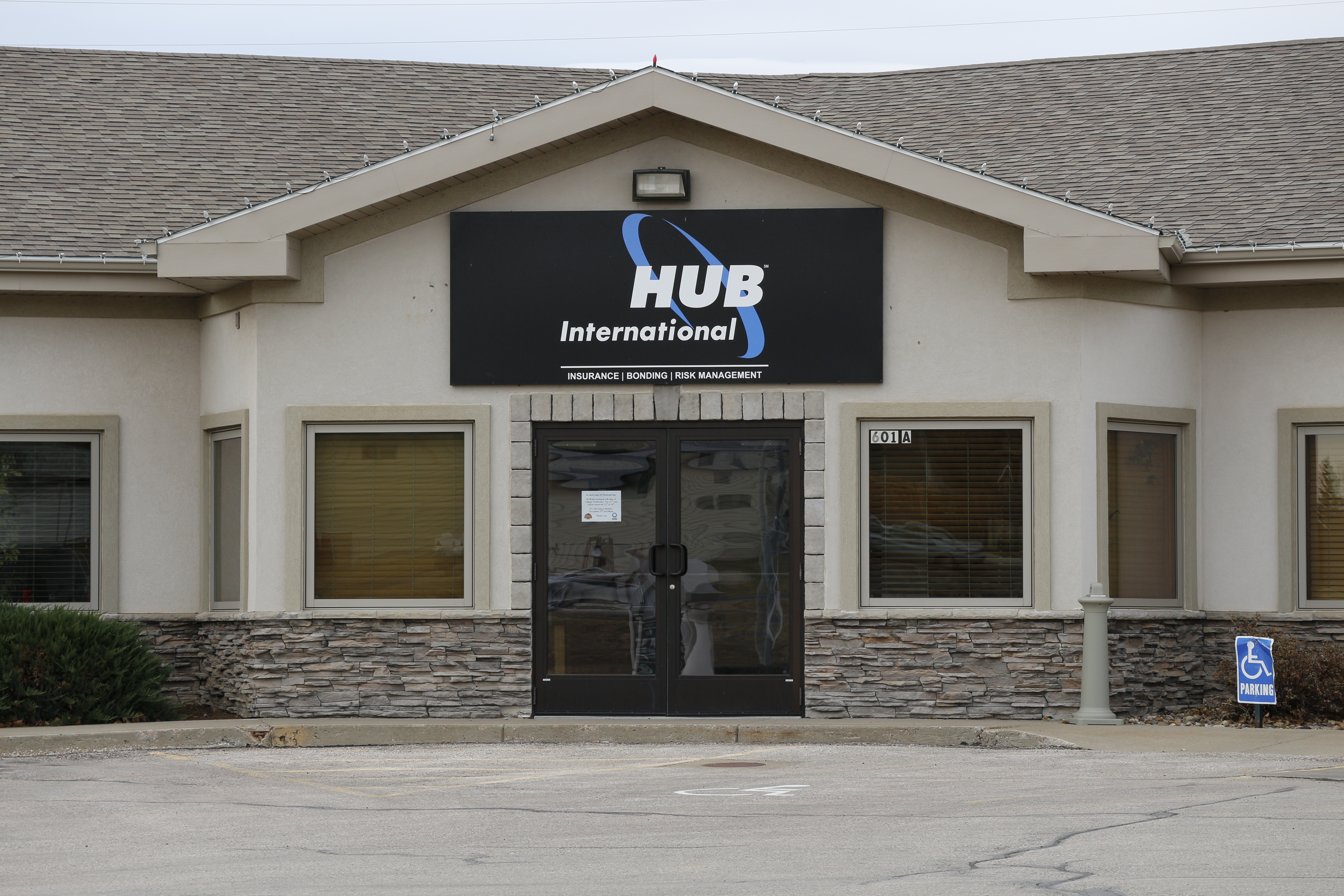
- HUB International in Gillette, Wyoming
- Type: Private
- Industry: Insurance, Financial Services
- Founded: 1998
- Headquarters: 150 North Riverside Plaza, 17th Floor, Chicago, Illinois 60606, United States
- Number of locations: 700+ (2026)
- Products: Brokerage: Property & Casualty Insurance, Private Client, Personal Insurance, Employee Benefits, Retirement Services, Wealth, Risk Services
- Revenue: ▲$5.28 billion USD (2025)
- Owner: Hellman & Friedman (majority), Atlas (minority), Leonard Green & Partners (minority).
- Number of employees: 21,000 (2026)
- Website: www.hubinternational.com

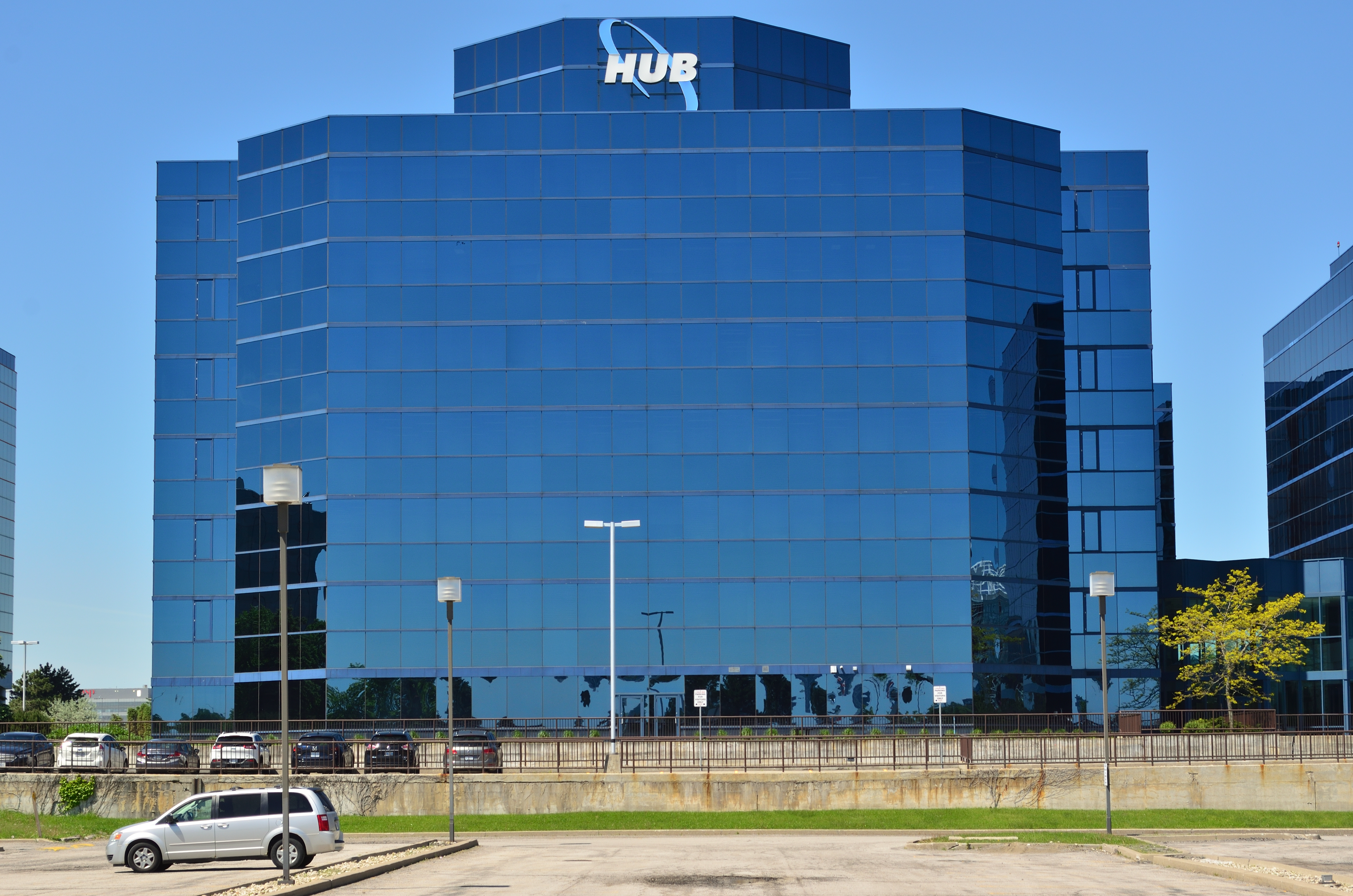
HUB International in Canada

HUB International Limited is a privately held insurance brokerage and financial services firm headquartered in Chicago, Illinois. Founded in 1998 through the merger of 11 Canadian brokerages, the company operates more than 700 offices across the U.S. and Canada and employs more than 21,000 people. HUB reported $5.28 billion in total revenue in 2025, ranking seventh among the world’s largest insurance brokers. In May 2025, HUB completed a $1.6 billion capital raise at a valuation of $29 billion. HUB is majority-owned by Hellman & Friedman, with minority stakes held by Altas and Leonard Green & Partners.

== History ==
Richard A. Gulliver began his insurance career in 1977 and eventually took over a small brokerage that his father had established in Leamington, Ontario. By the late 1990s, he had grown that operation into a larger Toronto-based firm called The Hub Group (Ontario) Inc.

In 1998, Gulliver’s brokerage merged with ten other Canadian brokerages to form HUB International Limited.

In 1999, HUB shares were publicly traded on the Toronto Stock Exchange. Martin P. Hughes, then President of Mack and Parker, Inc., joined HUB through acquisition and was named Chairman & CEO.

By 2000, annual revenue had increased to $95 million. In 2001, HUB relocated its headquarters to Chicago and established regional offices in the Northeast U.S. In 2002, HUB raised $88.1 million, through an initial public offering, listing its shares on the New York Stock Exchange.

In 2007, HUB’s market capitalization passed $1 billion and the company was purchased by an investor group led by private equity firm Apax Partners together with Morgan Stanley. In August 2013, HUB was acquired by the private equity firm Hellman & Friedman for $4.4 billion.

In 2017, HUB named Marc Cohen President and CEO; Martin Hughes continued as Executive Chairman of the Board. In 2018, HUB received a substantial minority investment from funds managed by Toronto-based investment firm Altas Partners.

In October 2021, Specialty Program Group, a subsidiary of HUB International, acquired CM&F Group, a provider of healthcare professional liability insurance coverage serving nurses, allied health professionals, and other healthcare practitioners.

In March 2022, HUB acquired Insureon, a Chicago-based digital insurance agency serving small businesses.

In June 2022, HUB launched VIU by HUB, a digital insurance brokerage platform offering personal lines consumers carrier choice, real-time quotes and licensed agent support for home and auto coverage. The platform also powers embedded insurance programs for automotive manufacturers, financial institutions and other enterprises, enabling those partners to offer insurance solutions within their own customer ecosystems.

In April 2023, Specialty Program Group acquired Squaremouth, a St. Petersburg, Florida-based digital travel insurance comparison platform that had insured more than three million travelers.

In 2023, Leonard Green & Partners made a minority investment in HUB at a valuation of approximately $23 billion.

Between 2021 and 2024, HUB launched several commercial risk practices. In 2021, the company launched a North American Complex Risk Practice to serve large and complex clients across the U.S. and Canada. In February 2023, HUB established a Global Risk Solutions practice to serve multinational clients operating across more than 100 countries. In January 2024, HUB launched a North American Property Practice focused on commercial property coverage.

By 2025, HUB reported total revenue of $5.28 billion and ranked seventh among the world's largest insurance brokers. In May 2025, HUB completed a $1.6 billion capital raise at a valuation of $29 billion.

In late 2025, HUB rolled out Anthropic's Claude AI across its approximately 20,000 employees.

== Services ==
HUB provides insurance brokerage, risk management, and financial services to businesses and individuals across North America. Its core offerings span commercial property and casualty insurance, employee benefits, retirement and private wealth advisory, personal lines, and specialty insurance programs.

In commercial insurance, HUB assists businesses in assessing risk exposure and placing coverage across property, liability, professional lines and surety. Its employee benefits division advises employers on group health, dental, life and disability programs, as well as retirement and executive compensation planning.

HUB's personal insurance practice serves individual clients with home, auto and specialty coverage needs. The company also operates HUB Private Client, a dedicated practice serving high-net-worth individuals and families with coverage for high-value homes, personal liability and complex personal risk management needs. Specialty programs address the insurance requirements of distinct industries and professions, including construction, healthcare, transportation and financial institutions.

== Mergers and acquisitions ==
HUB International has pursued an active acquisition strategy since its founding in 1998, completing 175 acquisitions between 2023 and 2025.

== Rankings and recognitions ==
HUB International has been consistently ranked among the world's largest insurance brokerages by two leading industry publications. Business Insurance ranked HUB seventh among the world's largest insurance brokers in its 2025 broker rankings based on total gross revenue of $5.28 billion. AM Best's similarly ranked HUB seventh among the top global insurance brokers, based on 2025 total revenues.

== Community involvement ==
HUB International operates a company-wide community engagement program called HUB Gives, through which regional offices select local charitable causes and coordinate employee volunteer efforts. The program encourages employees to donate their time and skills to community projects across HUB's North American office network. Areas of focus have included food security, disease awareness, youth programs, and support for families in need.
