= Paze =

Online payment system

- Type: Private
- Industry: Online payments; Digital wallet
- Headquarters: Scottsdale, Arizona, United States
- Parent: Early Warning Services, LLC
- Website: paze.com

Paze is an American online payment system, supported by several United States banks. Paze can be used by customers to make purchases online, without sharing their card number with the retailer, adding an extra layer of security.

== History ==
Paze launched in 2023 as a digital wallet developed by Early Warning Services, a consortium of banks including Bank of America, Capital One, JPMorgan Chase, PNC Bank, Truist, US Bank, and Wells Fargo. In October 2024, EWS hired Serge Elkiner, formerly of Visa, to serve as Paze's general manager. At this time, the service contained approximately 125 million debit and credit cards belonging to consumers with accounts at Early Warning financial institutions. It was also being used as a checkout option by companies such as United Airlines and Sephora.

In 2025, Paze and Nuvei formed a distribution partnership that made Paze a checkout option for approximately 100,000 Nuvei merchants. The Atlanta Hawks announced in September 2025 that Paze would become its jersey patch sponsor for the next five NBA seasons. In March 2026, Citibank began offering Paze to its eligible cardmembers. This partnership expanded the scope of Paze's service to approximately 165 million debit and credit cards. Paze also became more widely used by retailers in 2026, including national food chains such as Dunkin' and Wendy's.
