= PacWest Bancorp =

American bank holding company

- Company type: Subsidiary
- Industry: Banking; Financial services
- Founded: October 22, 1999; 26 years ago
- Defunct: December 1, 2023; 2 years ago
- Headquarters: Beverly Hills, California, U.S.
- Area served: California, Arizona, Utah, and Texas
- Key people: Paul Taylor (CEO); Mark Yung (COO); Kenan Sijamija (CCO); Matthew P. Wagner (executive chairman)
- Products: Retail banking, Commercial banking, Mortgage loans, Venture debt
- Revenue: ▲US$1.158 Billion (2021)
- Operating income: ▲US$0.193 billion (2021)
- Net income: ▲US$0.606 billion (2021)
- Total assets: ▲US$41.2 billion (2022)
- Total equity: ▲US$4.0 billion (2022)
- Number of employees: 2,438 (2022)
- Website: www.pacwest.com

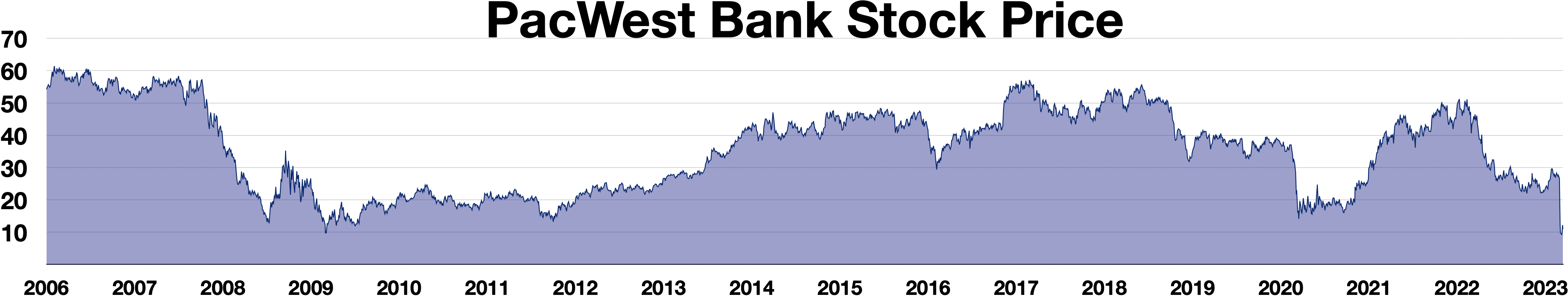
PacWest Bank stock price

PacWest Bancorp was an American bank holding company based in Beverly Hills, California, with one wholly owned banking subsidiary, Pacific Western Bank. It is a subsidiary of Banc of California.

It had 69 branches in California, primarily in the southern and central parts of the state, one in Denver, Colorado, one in Durham, North Carolina, and several loan production offices across the country.

The company was on the Forbes Global 2000 list, ranked 1972 in 2023.

== History ==
The bank was founded in October 1999 as First Community Bancorp. In March 2002, it acquired Capital Bank of North County. In April 2002, it acquired Upland Bank, with $108 million in assets. In 2005, it acquired Glendora, California–based Foothill Independent Bancorp for $238 million.

In 2006, First Community Bancorp combined the two banks it then owned, Pacific Western National Bank and First National Bank, renaming them the Pacific Western Bank. In 2008, First Community Bancorp reincorporated in Delaware and changed its name to PacWest Bancorp.

After the 2008 financial crisis, the bank acquired the assets and deposits of several banks that failed: it acquired Security Pacific Bank of Los Angeles in November 2008, Affinity Bank of Ventura, California in August 2009, and Los Padres Bank of Solvang in August 2010.

In April 2014, PacWest acquired CapitalSource for around $2.29 billion. In October 2015, it acquired Square 1 Financial Inc., the parent company of Durham, North Carolina–based Square 1 Bank with $3.1 billion in assets, for $815 million and became the sixth largest publicly traded bank in California.

In January 2019, PacWest retired the CapitalSource and Square 1 Bank brand names. In February 2021, eight months before acquiring MUFG Union Bank's homeowner association services division, it purchased Civic Financial Services, which mainly provides loans to home flippers.

=== 2023 banking crisis and sale of the bank ===
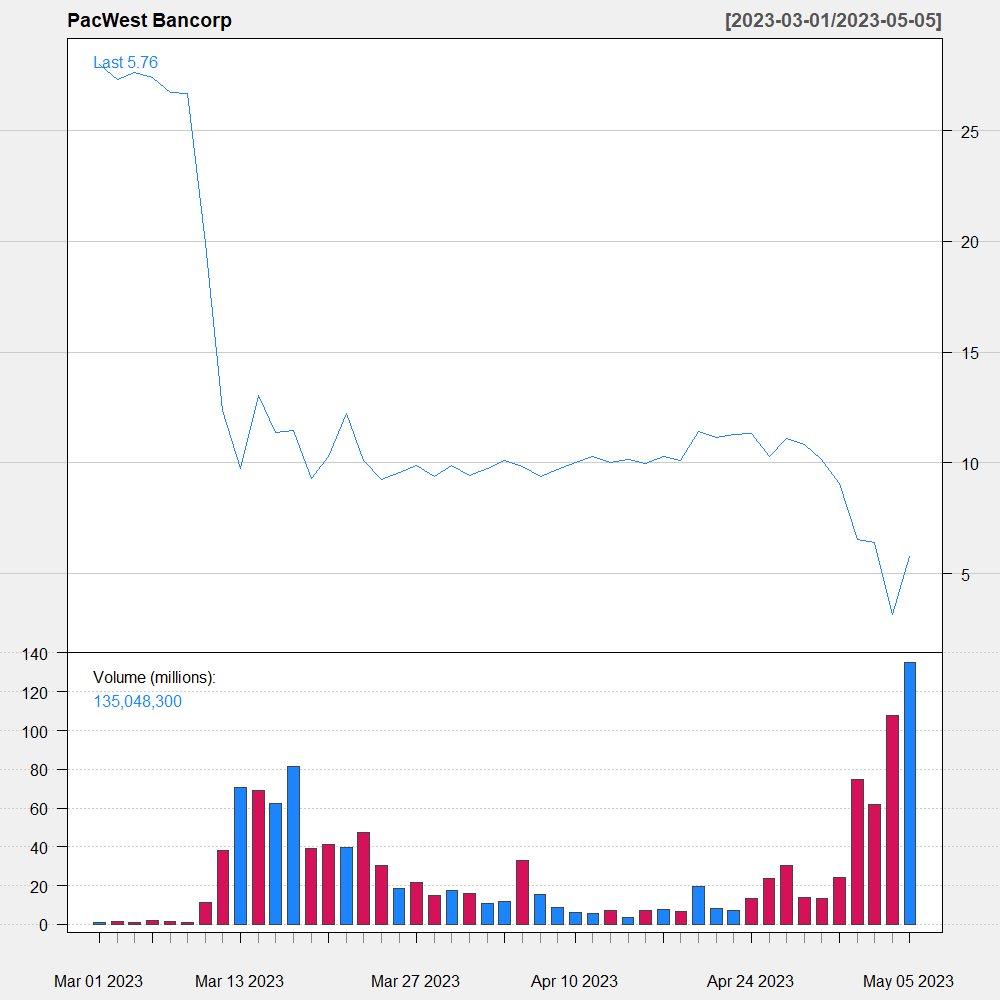
Chart of PACW stock from March 1 through May 8, 2023

In February 2023, the company announced 200 layoffs and halted new activity at its Civic Financial division after reporting a significant increase in delinquent loans in that division.

Between March and May 2023, the company's stock price plummeted as it reported losses of deposits as its customers feared a bank run. During the first quarter of 2023, deposits of the bank fell from $33.9 billion to $28.1 billion.

In May 2023, the bank sold its Civic Financial subsidiary. In the same month, it sold $2.6 billion worth of real estate construction loans at a $200 million discount to Kennedy Wilson.

In June 2023, the bank sold $1.2 billion in construction loan commitments in New York City with an aggregate balance of approximately $500 million to Cain International, based in London. Also in June 2023, the company sold a $3.54 billion lender finance portfolio to Ares Management.

In November 2023, the company was acquired by Banc of California. Affiliates of Warburg Pincus and Centerbridge Partners invested $400 million in the combined company. The merged bank has more than 2,200 employees serving small and medium-sized businesses. The services provided include: lending, healthcare and education banking, venture banking, warehouse lending, HOA services, payment processing solutions (through Deepstack Technologies).
