= Kronos Incorporated =

Workforce management software and services company

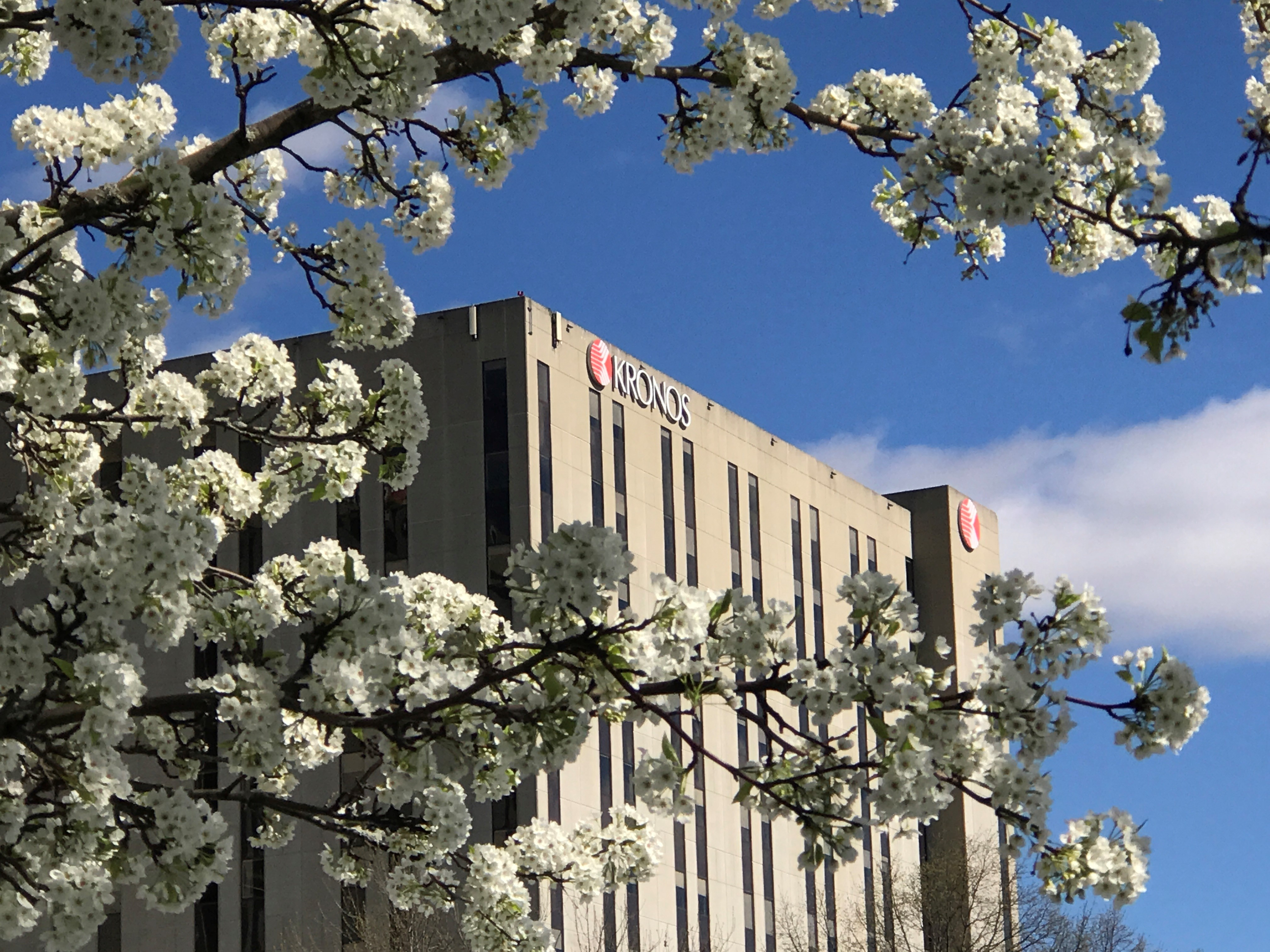
- Headquarters in Lowell, Massachusetts
- Type: Private
- Traded as: Nasdaq: KRON
- Founded: October 31, 1977; 49 years ago
- Founder: Mark S. Ain
- Defunct: April 1, 2020
- Fate: Merged with Ultimate Software
- Successor: Ultimate Kronos Group
- Headquarters: Lowell, Massachusetts, U.S.
- Key people: Aron Ain (CEO)
- Revenue: $1.433 billion (2019)
- Owner: Hellman & Friedman
- Number of employees: 6,000 (2019)
- Website: www.kronos.com

Kronos Incorporated was an American multinational workforce management and human capital management cloud provider headquartered in Lowell, Massachusetts, United States, which employed more than 6,000 people worldwide.

In February 2020, the company announced a merger with Ultimate Software. The merger was officially completed on April 1, 2020, with then-CEO of Kronos Aron Ain leading the newly formed Ultimate Kronos Group as its first CEO.

== History ==
Kronos was founded in 1977 by Massachusetts Institute of Technology (MIT) and Simon Business School alumnus Mark S. Ain. Under Mark Ain's leadership, Kronos sustained one of the longest records of growth and profitability as a public company in software industry history.

In 1979, Kronos delivered the world's first microprocessor-based time clock and, in 1985, delivered its first PC-based time and attendance product.

In 1992, Kronos became a publicly traded company on NASDAQ.

Aron Ain succeeded his brother Mark Ain as chief executive officer in 2005.

In March 2007, Kronos went private again, bought out for US$1.74 billion by the lead investor Hellman & Friedman and the secondary investor JMI Equity.

In 2012, the Third Circuit Court of Appeals enforced a subpoena seeking production of documents by Kronos, Inc., in an administrative charge before the EEOC alleging disability discrimination. The charge was brought by an individual job applicant against Kroger Food Co., who did not hire the job applicant and used a Kronos assessment as part of its hiring process. Kronos, which was not a party to the litigation, objected to the EEOC's subpoena on the basis that the information requested was irrelevant, and production would require Kronos to disclose protected trade secret information.

In 2014, private equity firms Blackstone and GIC invested in Kronos alongside Hellman & Friedman and JMI Equity. In the transaction, Kronos was valued at $4.5 billion. This was the first year that the company achieved $1 billion in annual revenue.

In 2017, Kronos moved its corporate headquarters from the nearby town of Chelmsford to the Cross Point Towers in Lowell, Massachusetts, consolidating multiple offices under one roof.

In February 2020, the company announced a merger with Ultimate Software to be led by Aron Ain.

In April 2020, as a response to the COVID-19 pandemic, Kronos introduced an automated report-generating tool to aid contact tracing. The tool analyzes work and attendance records of employees who test positive (or presumed positive) for COVID-19 to generate a report of potentially affected co-workers.

On December 13, 2021, Kronos announced that, on December 11, it was discovered that Kronos had been subject to a ransomware attack which disabled the functionality of the Kronos Private Cloud software for "up to several weeks". This breach forced many Kronos customers including municipalities, universities, and private employers to resort to alternative methods, including issuance of paper checks, to properly pay their employees.

== Acquisitions ==
Kronos conducted a number of acquisitions while in operation.The company acquired the Workforce Solutions software division of SimplexGrinnell in 2002.

In October 2009, the company acquired Stromberg from PayChex. Principal Decision Systems International (PDSI) was acquired in May 2011. A year later, in 2012, the company purchased SaaS provider SaaShr.com and OptiLink.

Time Link International Corporation (TimeLink) was purchased in 2013.

Kronos purchased Empower Software Solutions in 2016, and both Financial Management Solutions, Inc. (FMSI) and Digital Instinct Pty. Limited were purchased in 2017.
