= Midwest Dental =

American dental company

- Type: Subsidiary
- Industry: Corporate dentistry Dental support organization
- Founded: 1968; 58 years ago
- Founder: David Hehli
- Headquarters: Mondovi, Wisconsin
- Area served: United States
- Owner: Smile Brands, Inc.
- Number of employees: 2,300+ (2020)
- Website: www.midwest-dental.com

Midwest Dental is a United States dental support organization and a dental care practice with 230 offices in 17 states.

== History ==
Midwest Dental Care was founded in 1968 by David Hehli with the opening of his first clinic in Mondovi, Wisconsin. He eventually grew his practice to several dental offices throughout Wisconsin. Midwest Dental became the largest solely owned dental practice in the country at that time.

Hehli died on July 16, 2020, at the age of 77. Six months later, Smile Brands announced they had acquired Midwest Dental.
