= CapitalSource =

Commercial lender

- Type: Subsidiary
- Traded as: Nasdaq: CSE (until 2014)
- Industry: Financial services
- Founded: 2000; 26 years ago in Chevy Chase, Maryland
- Defunct: 2019; 7 years ago
- Headquarters: Los Angeles, California
- Key people: James J. Pieczynski (president)
- Products: Asset-based loans
- Parent: PacWest Bancorp (2014-present)
- Website: www.pacwest.com

CapitalSource is a commercial lender in the United States. It is a division of Pacific Western Bank and provides senior debt loans of $5 million to $100 million to middle-market companies throughout the United States. The company targets specific industries in its portfolio of holdings, particularly focusing on technology, real estate, healthcare, security, small business, golf finance, and equipment leasing companies. With $16 billion in assets and 80 full-service branches located throughout the state of California.

CapitalSource is often referred to as an on-balance sheet lender because its loans are originated, underwritten and managed internally. The majority of its loans are in three categories: first mortgage, cash-flow, and asset-based loans.

== History ==
CapitalSource was founded in 2000 by future Congressman John Delaney (D-MD) and Jason Fish with an initial capitalization of more than $500 million, which at the time was the largest private capitalization for a finance company.

In 2003, CapitalSource completed an IPO and began trading on the New York Stock Exchange (NYSE) under the symbol CSE. In 2006, CapitalSource completed its conversion to a Real Estate Investment Trust (REIT), which enabled the company to remain competitive in a highly liquid market due to the tax benefits of REIT status.

In 2009, CapitalSource completed its revocation of REIT status. Today the company operates as a C-Corp, as it did prior to 2006.

CapitalSource was briefly involved in a controversial hotel project which also involved rapper Jay-Z and developer Andre Balazs, but CapitalSource stepped out of the project when they sold the property note to another developer at a loss.

CapitalSource Bank was involved in another newsworthy property issue in 2010 when they foreclosed upon a high-end Manhattan project under development. The "Manhattan Blue" condominium building had initial interest from Leonardo DiCaprio, but the developers failed to sell enough units to make payments to CapitalSource.

In early 2012, CapitalSource moved its headquarters to Los Angeles.

In 2013, the Washington Post identified CapitalSource as a major lender to Aeon Financial, a secretive company that aggressively purchases tax liens and charges homeowners "excessive," "unreasonable," and "extraordinarily high" in order to avoid foreclosure.

CapitalSource was acquired by PacWest Bancorp in July 2013 for around $2.29 billion. The merger received final regulatory approval on April 1, 2014. In the agreement, CapitalSource, trading as CSE, ceased to trade at market close on April 7, 2014. Existing CapitalSource shareholders received a combination of cash and a fixed exchange ratio of PACW shares.

In April 2014, Pacific Western Bank and CapitalSource merged to form what is now the 6th largest publicly traded commercial bank headquartered in California, with more than $16 billion in assets. Following its acquisition of CapitalSource, Pacific Western Bank has faced opposition in its efforts to acquire additional lenders. For instance, after Pacific Western Bank unveiled plans to acquire California United Bank in 2017, community groups voiced concerns about the potential transaction, saying it should be approved only if the terms are changed.

== Recognition ==
CapitalSource Bank played a central role in the founding of the Elder Financial Protection Network (EFPN), and the California State Legislature presented CapitalSource Bank with a Certificate of Recognition for helping to launch and maintain it. Gary Dunn, Capital Source Bank’s VP CRA, is a member of the Board of Directors for EFPN, serving as Treasurer. CapitalSource Bank was awarded a Bank Enterprise Award from the Community Development Financial Institutions Fund by the U.S. Treasury Department for its investment in low-income and economically distressed communities in California in 2010.
