= LiveView Technologies =

Video surveillance company in Utah, US

- Type: Private
- Industry: Video surveillance
- Founded: 2005
- Founder: Ryan Porter; Bob Brenner
- Website: https://lvt.com

LiveView Technologies (LVT) is a video surveillance company based in Orem, Utah. It was founded by Ryan Porter and Bob Brenner in 2005.

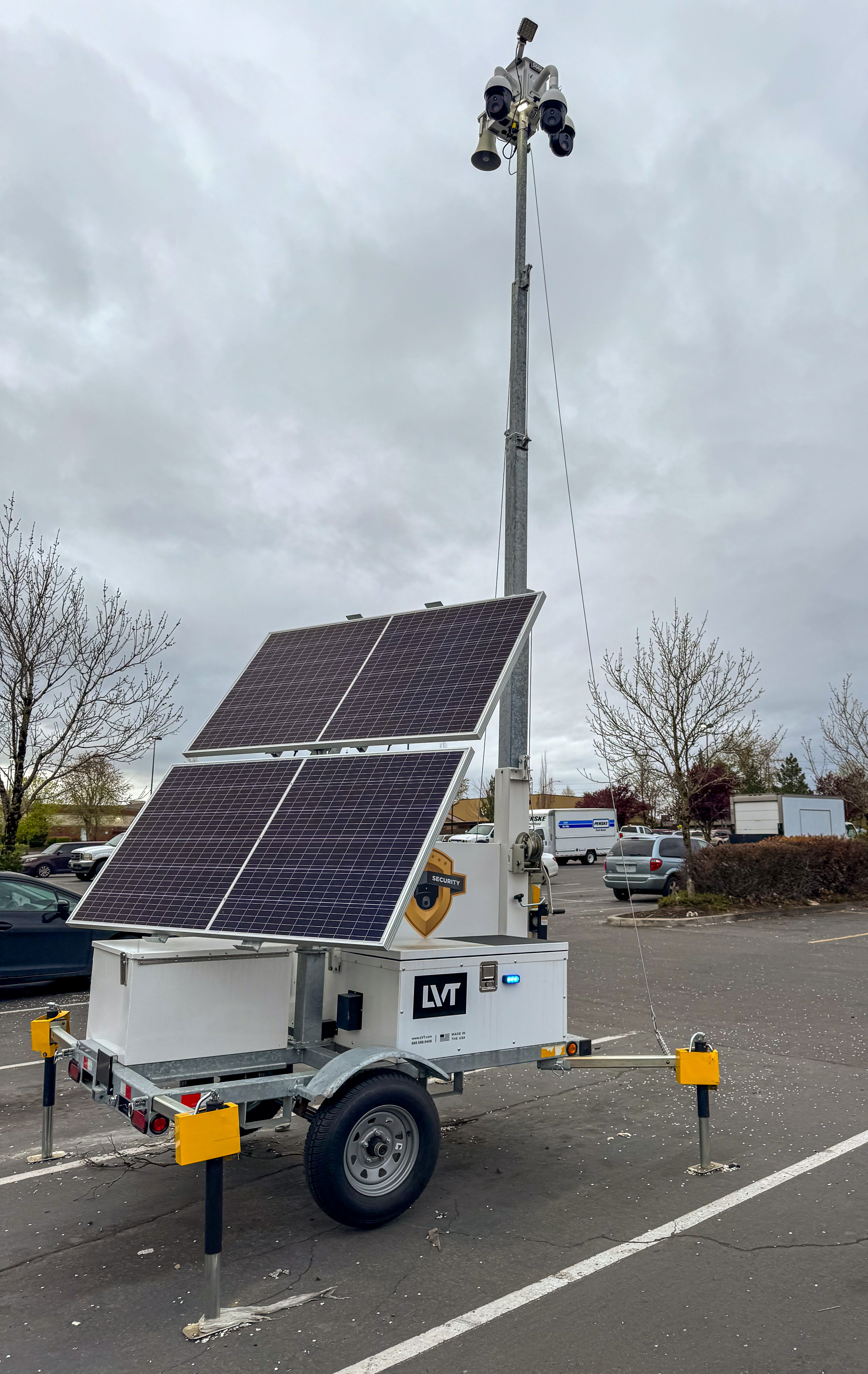
LVT security trailer in a Home Depot parking lot.

The company creates the D3 Mobile Security Unit, a solar-powered surveillance trailer with cameras on a 22-foot pole, a two-way audio system, and blue flashing lights. The trailers are often placed in retail parking lots and paid for by retailers including Advance Auto Parts, Home Depot, Kroger, Lowes, Safeway, Walgreens, and Walmart.

Oroville, California's police department pays $45,000 per year for one LVT trailer. Another source placed the price at $3000 per month. An LVT trailer in a San Francisco Safeway parking lot played classical music at a loud level 24 hours per day for at least a week to deter loitering, per Safeway's corporate response. The 24/7 music has also been used in an LVT at a Home Depot in Denver.

Monroe County, New York has deployed LVT to surveil protests in Rochester, including Gaza war protests.

LVT has been the main jersey sponsor of NBA's Utah Jazz since 2023, in a deal organized by Klutch Sports Group.

LVT has installed solar-powered cameras for the State of Utah along the state's creeks and rivers to detect flooding.

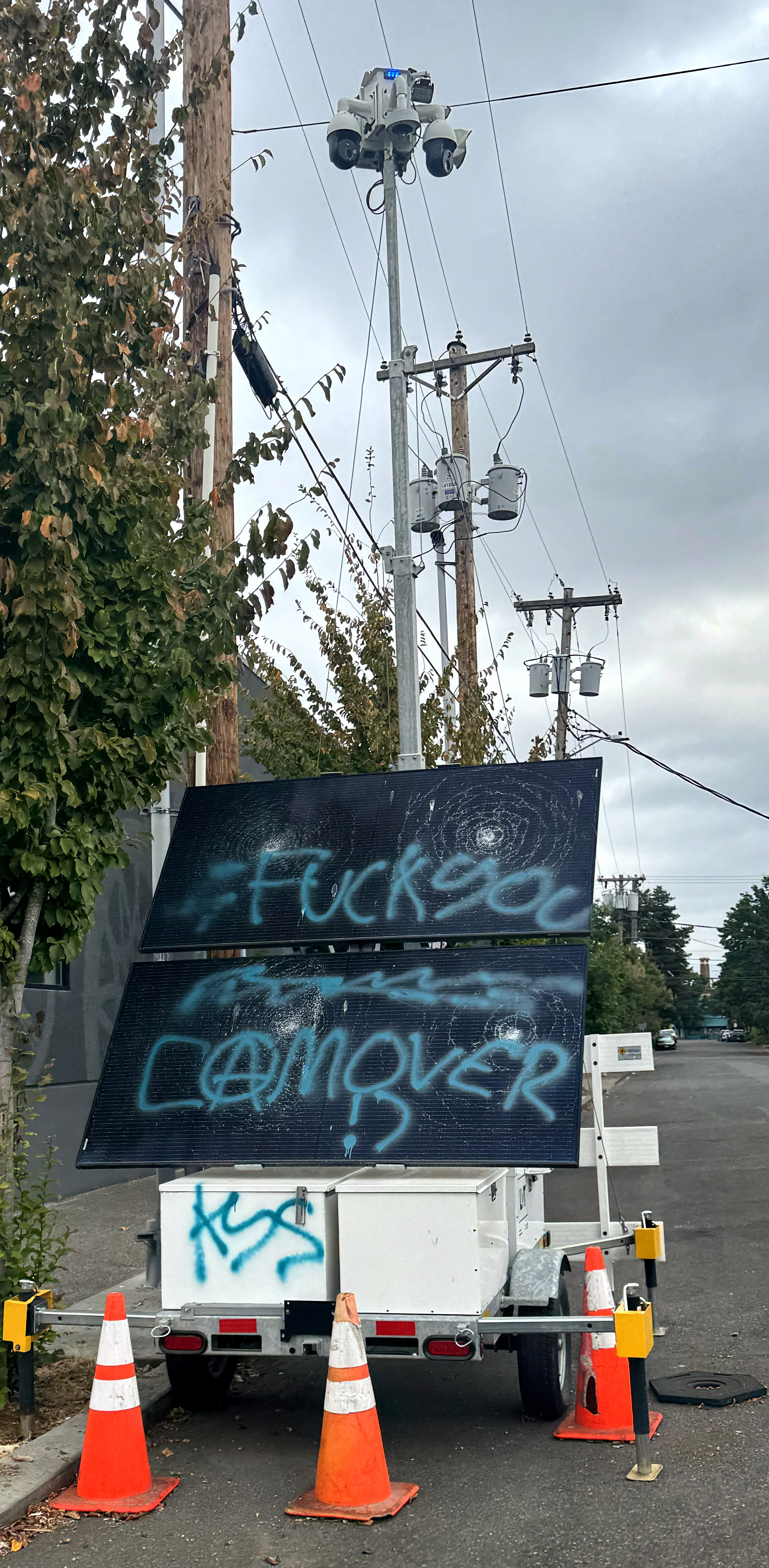
A vandalized LiveView Technologies camera system in Portland, Oregon

The company announced its $50 million Series B round in June 2022. Sorenson Capital, Pelion Ventures, The Larry H. Miller Group, and Lead Edge Capital are funders.

Colorado terminated an $8 million contract with LVT that provided 136 highway cameras, citing "poor performance", in October 2025.

== See also ==
- Flock Safety
- Axon Enterprise
