= UKG =

American software company

- Type: Private
- Industry: Cloud computing; Workforce management; human resource management; Payroll
- Predecessors: Ultimate Software; Kronos Incorporated
- Founded: April 1, 2020; 6 years ago
- Headquarters: Weston, Florida; Lowell, Massachusetts
- Key people: Aron Ain (executive chairperson); Jennifer Morgan (CEO)
- Owners: Hellman & Friedman (~50%); The Blackstone Group (20–25%)
- Website: www.ukg.com

UKG (Ultimate Kronos Group) is an American multinational technology company with dual headquarters in Lowell, Massachusetts, and Weston, Florida. UKG is the AI-first Workplace Operating Platform with unified HR, payroll, and workforce management services.

== History ==
On February 20, 2020, Ultimate Software and Kronos Incorporated announced an agreement to form a new cloud computing venture, specializing in workforce management and human capital management. The combined company, valued at $22 billion, would be one of the largest cloud computing companies in the world. The merger was officially completed on April 1, 2020, and, in August, the company's name was announced as Ultimate Kronos Group (UKG), which became effective on October 1.

In December 2021, UKG disclosed that it was targeted by a ransomware attack that was first detected on December 11, 2021. The malware attack affected the Kronos Private Cloud feature used by many large businesses including Boots, Gap Inc., Marriott International, MGM Resorts International, PepsiCo, Sainsbury's, Samsung, Staples Inc., Tesla, Inc., Whole Foods Market, Yamaha Corporation, YMCA, and others while some governmental entities such as the cities of Cleveland, Springfield, Massachusetts as well as the New York Metropolitan Transportation Authority were also affected. Many sources reported that the attack possibly occurred as a result of the Log4Shell zero-day, but UKG claimed it had no evidence that Log4Shell was responsible for the ransomware incident.

In July 2024, Jennifer Morgan became chief executive officer.

=== Workforce—Institute and Activity Report ===
Established in 2007, Workforce Institute is the company's think tank and research platform for organizations providing information on Human Capital Management issues, including working environment optimization, analytical and educational tools, accommodation of people with disabilities, and more. The organization also conducts surveys and issues annual reports on global workforce trends and developments.

The Workforce Activity Report is an index that analyzes shift work trends from over four million people across more than 35,000 U.S. businesses. Reports are published, and briefings are held each Tuesday before the Bureau of Labor Statistics Employment Situation Report is published. The Report is widely covered by news organizations and government sources.

== Acquisitions ==
| Date | Acquisition | Details | Reference |
|---|---|---|---|
| 2021 | EverythingBenefits | Allowed UKG to incorporate EverythingBenefits' procedural knowledge, including its payroll, HR service delivery, and workforce management tools | |
| 2021 | Great Place to Work | Runs Fortune's annual list of 100 Best Companies to Work For | |
| 2021 | Ascentis Corporation | Midmarket provider of HCM and time management solutions | |
| 2022 | SpotCues | Employee engagement and communication solution. SpotCues was relaunched as UKG Talk. | |
| 2022 | Interboro Systems Corporation | Caribbean market expansion | |
| 2022 | Quorbit | Oxford-headquartered strategic workforce planning software company | |
| 2023 | Immedis | Irish global payroll platform, relaunched as UKG OneView with a focus on multinational workforce management, payroll, tax and funding | |
| 2025 | Mo | UK-based employee recognition and culture-building platform, integrated into UKG Beacon for employee engagement capabilities | |

== Products and services ==
- UKG Pro Suite
- UKG Ready Suite
- Workforce Intelligence Hub
- UKG OneView

== Awards and recognition ==
- America's Greatest Workplaces 2023, Newsweek
- America's Most Innovative Companies 2023, Fortune
- America's Best Large Employers 2024, Forbes
- World's Most Innovative Companies 2024, Fast Company
- America's Greatest Workplaces for Diversity 2024 & 2025, Newsweek
- America's Best Employers for Tech Workers 2025, Forbes
