= Ultimate Software =

Former American multinational technology company

Ultimate Software Group, Inc.
- Type: Private
- Industry: SaaS HCM Software
- Founded: 1990; 36 years ago
- Founder: Scott Scherr
- Defunct: April 1, 2020
- Fate: Merged with Kronos Incorporated
- Successor: Ultimate Kronos Group
- Headquarters: Weston, Florida
- Area served: United States; Canada
- Key people: Scott Scherr (CEO)
- Products: Human Resources; Payroll; Recruiting; Onboarding; Talent Management; Time Management; Global HCM
- Services: Managed Services; Payment Services; Print Services; Check Printing
- Revenue: $940.1 million (2017)
- Owner: Hellman & Friedman
- Number of employees: 5,144 (2019)
- Website: www.ultimatesoftware.com

Ultimate Software was an American multinational technology company that developed and sold UltiPro, a cloud-based human capital management (HCM) software system for businesses. Headquartered in Weston, Florida, the company was founded in 1990 by Scott Scherr, and it released its first version of software in 1993. As of the fourth quarter in 2017, Ultimate Software reported total revenues of over $940.7 million. As of 2017, the company employed more than 5,000 people and serviced 4,100 customers in 160 countries. Ultimate had offices around the U.S., Canada, UK, and Singapore. On February 4, 2019, Hellman & Friedman Capital Partners announced it would purchase Ultimate Software Group for $11 billion; the purchase closed on May 3, 2019.

In February 2020, Ultimate Software announced its plan to merge with Kronos Incorporated to form a cloud-computing venture specializing in human resource software. The merger was completed on April 1, 2020. The company is named Ultimate Kronos Group.

== History ==
Ultimate Software was founded in 1990 by Scott Scherr. In 1993, the tech company released UltiPro HRMS/payroll sold as on-premise software servicing core HR and payroll. The company went public (NASDAQ: ULTI) in June 1998.

In 2002, UltiPro was reintroduced as a cloud-based model to provide a unified management tool for human resources. This model allowed the company to hold more than 33 million client records in the cloud and provide services to more than 3,400 customers, according to Career Builder. The company expanded outside of the United States and opened an office in London, England. Later that year, Ultimate announced additional expansion in Singapore.

== Products and services ==
The company's UltiPro is a cloud-based platform that delivers human capital management to organizations across all industries. UltiPro provides one system of record for HR, payroll, and talent management. According to TrustRadius, UltiPro includes time and attendance, employee onboarding, performance management, compensation management, succession management, recruiting, and other features like predictive analytics.
