= COX15 =

Protein-coding gene in the species Homo sapiens

Identifiers
- Aliases: COX15, CEMCOX2, COX15 cytochrome c oxidase assembly homolog, cytochrome c oxidase assembly homolog, cytochrome c oxidase assembly homolog COX15
- External IDs: OMIM: 603646; MGI: 1920112; HomoloGene: 5848; GeneCards: COX15; OMA:COX15 - orthologs

Gene location (Human)
Chr.	Chromosome 10 (human)
Band	10q24.2	Start	99,711,844 bp
Band	10q24.2	End	99,732,100 bp

Gene location (Mouse)
Chr.	Chromosome 19 (mouse)
Band	19|19 C3	Start	43,721,693 bp
Band	19|19 C3	End	43,741,439 bp
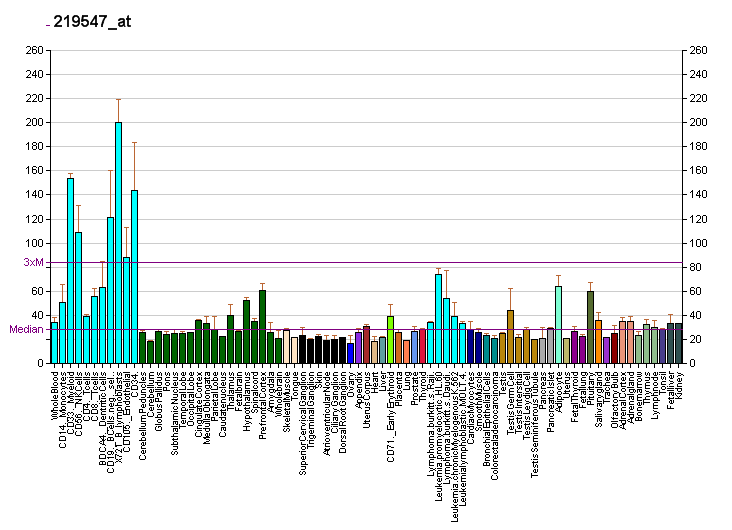

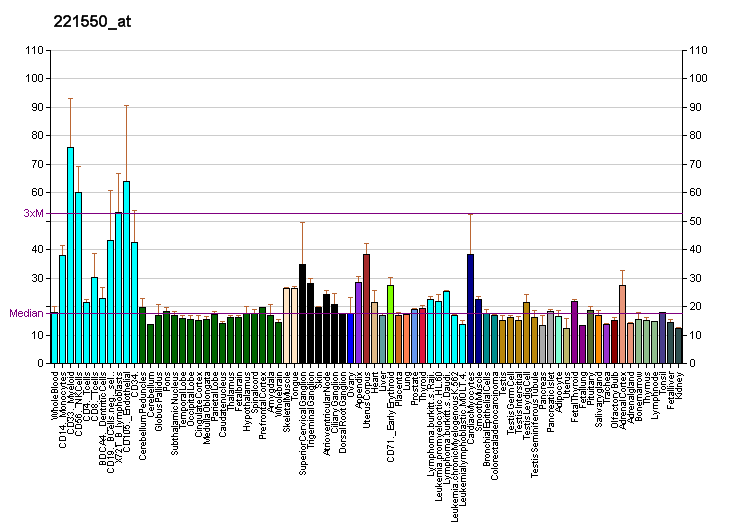
RNA expression pattern
Bgee	Human / Mouse (ortholog); Top expressed in: caput epididymis; corpus epididymis; tail of epididymis; right uterine tube; Skeletal muscle tissue of rectus abdominis; right adrenal gland; right adrenal cortex; left adrenal gland; renal medulla; body of tongue / Top expressed in: epithelium of small intestine; external carotid artery; internal carotid artery; seminal vesicula; atrium; epithelium of stomach; soleus muscle; migratory enteric neural crest cell; barrel cortex; ciliary body; More reference expression data
BioGPS	More reference expression data
Gene ontology
Molecular function	cytochrome-c oxidase activity; oxidoreductase activity, acting on the CH-CH group of donors; protein binding; oxidoreductase activity, acting on NAD(P)H, heme protein as acceptor; heme binding; molecular adaptor activity
Cellular component	mitochondrial respirasome; cytochrome complex; integral component of membrane; mitochondrial membranes; mitochondrion; membrane; nucleus; mitochondrial inner membrane
Biological process	cellular respiration; proton transmembrane transport; respiratory chain complex IV assembly; heme biosynthetic process; heme A biosynthetic process; mitochondrial electron transport, cytochrome c to oxygen; respiratory gaseous exchange by respiratory system
Sources:Amigo / QuickGO
Orthologs
Species	Human	Mouse
Entrez	1355	226139
Ensembl	ENSG00000014919	ENSMUSG00000040018
UniProt	Q7KZN9	Q8BJ03
RefSeq (mRNA)	NM_004376; NM_078470; NM_001320974; NM_001320975; NM_001320976	NM_144874
RefSeq (protein)	NP_001307903; NP_001307904; NP_001307905; NP_004367; NP_510870 NP_001358953; NP_001358954; NP_001358955; NP_001358956; NP_001358957	NP_659123
Location (UCSC)	Chr 10: 99.71 – 99.73 Mb	Chr 19: 43.72 – 43.74 Mb
PubMed search
- Wikidata
View/Edit Human	View/Edit Mouse

Cytochrome c oxidase assembly protein COX15 homolog (COX15), also known as heme A synthase, is a protein that in humans is encoded by the COX15 gene. This protein localizes to the inner mitochondrial membrane and involved in heme A biosynthesis. COX15 is also part of a three-component mono-oxygenase (ferredoxin, ferredoxin reductase, and COX15) that catalyses the hydroxylation of the methyl group at position eight of the protoheme molecule. Mutations in this gene has been reported in patients with hypertrophic cardiomyopathy as well as Leigh syndrome, and characterized by delayed onset of symptoms, hypotonia, feeding difficulties, failure to thrive, motor regression, and brain stem signs.

== Structure ==
=== Gene ===
The COX15 gene lies on the chromosome location of 10q24 and consists of nine exons. Two splice variants formed by alternative splicing at exon 9, COX15.1 and COX15.2, differ in the C-terminal domain of the protein and the 39-UTR of the transcript. But the functional significance of the different isoforms is still unknown.

=== Protein ===
The COX15 protein localizes to the inner mitochondrial membrane and has several predicted transmembrane domains. Four conserved histidine residues are proven to be critical for COX15 activity. Both COX15 multimerization and enzymatic activity would be impaired if the 20-residue linker region connecting the two conserved domains of COX15 is removed.

== Function ==
COX15 is one of the cytochrome c oxidase (COX) assembly factors identified in yeast, playing a key role in the biosynthetic pathway of mitochondrial heme A, the prosthetic group of cytochrome a and a3. COX15 in yeast mediates hydroxylation of the methyl group at the C-8 position of the heme O molecule to form heme A. A deletion of COX15 results in undetectable levels of heme A but detectable levels of heme O. Similar findings are observed in patients with COX15 deletion mutants, suggesting a similar functional role for COX15 in mammalian mitochondria and a similar pathogenesis for the COX deficiency. In complex IV of the respiratory chain, heme A is required for the proper folding of the Cox 1 subunit and subsequent assembly. A deficiency in the formation of heme A and functional COX would lead to impaired electron transport and oxidative phosphorylation. COX15 multimerization is important for heme A biosynthesis and/or transfer to maturing COX.

== Clinical significance ==
COX deficiency is one of the most frequent causes of electron transport chain defects in humans. Therefore, in highly energy-demanding organs and tissues, such as brain and retinal tissue, with mutations in COX15, different clinical phenotypes are presented, such as early onset, fatal hypertrophic cardiomyopathy, Leigh syndrome, and encephalopathy. Signs and symptoms of these diseases that can manifest include lactic acidosis, ataxia, hypotonia, seizures, respiratory distress, psychomotor retardation, vision loss, eye movement abnormalities, dysphagia, and central nervous system lesions. A sequence variation in COX15 has also been reported to associate with determining the genetic risk for Alzheimer's disease development.

== Interactions ==
COX15 associates with Shy1 in distinct complexes, C-terminal epitope tagging of COX15 selectively affects its association to cytochrome c oxidase assembly intermediates (COA complexes). COX15 also forms complexes with maturing COX1, the heme-receiving subunit of COX, in the absence of Shy1. COX15 is positively regulated by intracellular heme levels via Huntingtin-associated protein 1.
