= COX14 =

Protein-coding gene in humans

Identifiers
- Aliases: COX14, C12orf62, COX14 cytochrome c oxidase assembly factor, cytochrome c oxidase assembly factor, PCAG1, cytochrome c oxidase assembly factor MC4DN10
- External IDs: OMIM: 614478; MGI: 1913629; GeneCards: COX14

Gene location (Human)
Chr.	Chromosome 12 (human)
Band	12q13.12	Start	50,112,082 bp
Band	12q13.12	End	50,120,457 bp

Gene location (Mouse)
Chr.	Chromosome 15 (mouse)
Band	15|15 F1	Start	99,623,528 bp
Band	15|15 F1	End	99,627,413 bp
RNA expression pattern
Bgee	Human / Mouse (ortholog); Top expressed in: apex of heart; right auricle of heart; left ventricle; muscle of thigh; right adrenal gland; gastrocnemius muscle; anterior pituitary; left adrenal gland; mucosa of transverse colon; left adrenal cortex / Top expressed in: embryo; blastocyst; extraocular muscle; digastric muscle; myocardium of ventricle; temporal muscle; morula; sternocleidomastoid muscle; soleus muscle; facial motor nucleus; More reference expression data
BioGPS	n/a
Orthologs
Databases	NCBI: entry; OMA: entry
Species	Human	Mouse
Entrez	84987	66379
Ensembl	ENSG00000178449	ENSMUSG00000023020
UniProt	Q96I36	Q8BH51
RefSeq (mRNA)	NM_001257133; NM_001257134; NM_032901	NM_183256
RefSeq (protein)	NP_001244062; NP_001244063; NP_116290	NP_899079
Location (UCSC)	Chr 12: 50.11 – 50.12 Mb	Chr 15: 99.62 – 99.63 Mb
PubMed search
- Wikidata
View/Edit Human	View/Edit Mouse

Cytochrome c oxidase assembly factor COX14 is a protein that in humans is encoded by the COX14 gene. This gene encodes a small single-pass transmembrane protein that localizes to mitochondria. This protein may play a role in coordinating the early steps of cytochrome c oxidase (COX; also known as complex IV) subunit assembly and, in particular, the synthesis and assembly of the COX I subunit of the holoenzyme. Mutations in this gene have been associated with mitochondrial complex IV deficiency. Alternative splicing results in multiple transcript variants.

== Structure ==
The COX14 gene is located on the q arm of chromosome 12 at position 13.12 and it spans 8,476 base pairs. The COX14 gene produces a 6.6 kDa protein composed of 57 amino acids. COX14 is a component of the enzyme MITRAC (mitochondrial translation regulation assembly intermediate of cytochrome c oxidase complex) complex, and the structure contains a central transmembrane domain.

== Function ==
The COX14 gene encodes for a core protein component of the MITRAC (mitochondrial translation regulation assembly intermediate of cytochrome c oxidase complex) complex, which is required for the proper regulation of complex IV assembly. Complex IV of the mitochondrial respiratory chain is essential in catalyzing the oxidation of cytochrome c by molecular oxygen. COX14 has been shown to contribute to the early stages of complex IV assembly by coelution with COX1 and COX4 for nucleation of the assembly. The protein participates in the coupling synthesis of COX1 followed by an assembly of nascent subunits into the holoenzyme complex IV. The knockdown of the protein COX14 involving small interfering RNA in regular human fibroblast has been shown to result in a complex IV defect with reduced activity.

== Clinical significance ==
Variants of COX14 have been associated with the mitochondrial Complex IV deficiency, a deficiency in an enzyme complex of the mitochondrial respiratory chain which catalyzes the oxidation of cytochrome c utilizing molecular oxygen. The deficiency is characterized by heterogeneous phenotypes ranging from isolated myopathy to severe multisystem disease affecting several tissues and organs. Other Clinical Manifestations include hypertrophic cardiomyopathy, hepatomegaly and liver dysfunction, hypotonia, muscle weakness, exercise intolerance, developmental delay, delayed motor development and intellectual disability. A mutation in the homozygous missense mutation c.88G>A in the COX14 gene has resulted in the dysfunction of complex IV assembly and an unstable nascent enzyme complex.

== Interactions ==
Like COA3, COX14 is a key component of the MITRAC (mitochondrial translation regulation assembly intermediate of cytochrome c oxidase complex) complex. In addition, it has interactions with proteins such as COX17, COX1, LMNA, COA3, SPPL2B, and others.
