= PET100 =

Protein-coding gene in the species Homo sapiens

Identifiers
- Aliases: PET100, C19orf79, PET100 homolog, PET100 cytochrome c oxidase chaperone, MC4DN12
- External IDs: OMIM: 614770; MGI: 3615306; HomoloGene: 87502; GeneCards: PET100; OMA:PET100 - orthologs

Gene location (Human)
Chr.	Chromosome 19 (human)
Band	19p13.2	Start	7,629,793 bp
Band	19p13.2	End	7,631,956 bp

Gene location (Mouse)
Chr.	Chromosome 8 (mouse)
Band	8|8 A1.1	Start	3,671,548 bp
Band	8|8 A1.1	End	3,675,848 bp
RNA expression pattern
Bgee	Human / Mouse (ortholog); Top expressed in: bone marrow cell; epithelium of colon; monocyte; apex of heart; olfactory zone of nasal mucosa; tonsil; granulocyte; left ventricle; human kidney; primary visual cortex / Top expressed in: granulocyte; interventricular septum; yolk sac; right kidney; dentate gyrus of hippocampal formation granule cell; pyloric antrum; facial motor nucleus; intercostal muscle; muscle of thigh; medial ganglionic eminence; More reference expression data
BioGPS	n/a
Gene ontology
Molecular function	unfolded protein binding
Cellular component	membrane; mitochondrion; integral component of membrane; integral component of mitochondrial inner membrane
Biological process	mitochondrial cytochrome c oxidase assembly
Sources:Amigo / QuickGO
Orthologs
Species	Human	Mouse
Entrez	100131801	100503890
Ensembl	ENSG00000229833	ENSMUSG00000087687
UniProt	P0DJ07	P0DJE0
RefSeq (mRNA)	NM_001171155	NM_001195244
RefSeq (protein)	NP_001164626	NP_001182173
Location (UCSC)	Chr 19: 7.63 – 7.63 Mb	Chr 8: 3.67 – 3.68 Mb
PubMed search
- Wikidata
View/Edit Human	View/Edit Mouse

PET100 homolog is a protein that in humans is encoded by the PET100 gene. Mitochondrial complex IV, or cytochrome c oxidase, is a large transmembrane protein complex that is part of the respiratory electron transport chain of mitochondria. The small protein encoded by the PET100 gene plays a role in the biogenesis of mitochondrial complex IV. This protein localizes to the inner mitochondrial membrane and is exposed to the intermembrane space. Mutations in this gene are associated with mitochondrial complex IV deficiency. This gene has a pseudogene on chromosome 3. Alternative splicing results in multiple transcript variants.

== Structure ==
The PET100 gene is located on the p arm of chromosome 19 in position 13.2 and spans 1,839 base pairs. The gene produces a 9.1 kDa protein composed of 73 amino acids. The encoded protein localizes to the inner mitochondrial membrane and is exposed to the intermembrane space. This protein's N-terminus is essential for mitochondrial localization. It assembles into a 300 kDA complex which is dependent on the mitochondrial membrane potential, accumulating over time.

== Function ==
The protein encoded by PET100 is involved in Complex IV biogenesis as a COX chaperone; it is required for interaction between MR-1S, PET117, and Complex IV.

== Clinical significance ==
In 8 patients of Lebanese origin living in Australia, a c.3G>C mutation in the PET100 gene caused Complex IV deficiency and Leigh syndrome. Symptoms included delayed psychomotor development, seizures, hypotonia, brain abnormalities, and elevated blood and cerebrospinal fluid lactate levels. In another patient of Pakistani origin, a homozygous c.142C>T mutation resulted in Complex IV deficiency with intrauterine growth retardation, metabolic and lactic acidosis, hypoglycemia, coagulopathy, elevated serum creatine kinase levels, seizures, and intraventricular cysts.

== Interactions ==
The encoded protein interacts with MR-1S and COX7A2. This protein is required for MR-1S, PET117, and Complex IV to interact.
