= COA7 =

Protein found in humans

Identifiers
- Aliases: COA7, C1orf163, RESA1, SELRC1, cytochrome c oxidase assembly factor 7 (putative), SCAN3, cytochrome c oxidase assembly factor 7
- External IDs: OMIM: 615623; MGI: 1917143; GeneCards: COA7

Gene location (Human)
Chr.	Chromosome 1 (human)
Band	1p32.3	Start	52,684,449 bp
Band	1p32.3	End	52,698,347 bp

Gene location (Mouse)
Chr.	Chromosome 4 (mouse)
Band	4 C7|4 50.44 cM	Start	108,185,337 bp
Band	4 C7|4 50.44 cM	End	108,198,741 bp
RNA expression pattern
Bgee	Human / Mouse (ortholog); Top expressed in: secondary oocyte; vastus lateralis muscle; Skeletal muscle tissue of biceps brachii; mucosa of sigmoid colon; Skeletal muscle tissue of rectus abdominis; gastrocnemius muscle; gingival epithelium; muscle of thigh; islet of Langerhans; right ventricle / Top expressed in: yolk sac; morula; interventricular septum; blastocyst; embryo; embryo; otic placode; primitive streak; epiblast; right kidney; More reference expression data
BioGPS	n/a
Orthologs
Databases	NCBI: entry; OMA: entry
Species	Human	Mouse
Entrez	65260	69893
Ensembl	ENSG00000162377	ENSMUSG00000048351
UniProt	Q96BR5	Q921H9
RefSeq (mRNA)	NM_023077	NM_027250
RefSeq (protein)	NP_075565	NP_081526
Location (UCSC)	Chr 1: 52.68 – 52.7 Mb	Chr 4: 108.19 – 108.2 Mb
PubMed search
- Wikidata
View/Edit Human	View/Edit Mouse

Cytochrome c oxidase assembly factor 7 (putative) (COA7), also known as Beta-lactamase hap-like protein, Respiratory chain assembly factor 1 (RESA1), Sel1 repeat-containing protein 1 (SELRC1), or C1orf163, is a protein that in humans is encoded by the COA7 gene. The protein encoded by COA7 is an assembly factor important for the mitochondrial respiratory chain. Mutations in COA7 have been associated with cytochrome c oxidase deficiency resulting in spinocerebellar ataxia with axonal neuropathy type 3 and mitochondrial myopathy.

== Structure ==
COA7 is located on the p arm of chromosome 1 in position 32.3 and has 3 exons. The COA7 gene produces a 25.7 kDa protein composed of 231 amino acids. COA7, the protein encoded by this gene, is a member of the hcp beta-lactamase family. This protein has a series of 5 Sel1-like tetratricopeptide repeat domains. It is also believed to be a soluble mitochondrial protein that contains large amounts of cysteine. Additionally, COA7 contains an N-acetylalanine amino acid modification at position 2.

== Function ==
COA7 is a protein assembly factor that is important for normal mitochondrial respiratory chain activity. It is believed to be involved in the assembly of cytochrome c oxidase (complex IV), but may also have effects on complex I and even complex III as well. It has been suggested that COA7 is a mitochondrial soluble intermembrane space protein, however, others have indicated that this soluble protein may actually be localized to the mitochondrial matrix.

== Clinical significance ==
Mutations in COA7 have been associated with spinocerebellar ataxia with axonal neuropathy type 3 and mitochondrial myopathy resulting from cytochrome c oxidase (complex IV) deficiency. Complex IV deficiency is a disorder of the mitochondrial respiratory chain with heterogeneous clinical manifestations, ranging from isolated myopathy to severe multisystem disease affecting several tissues and organs. In cases of pathogenic COA7 mutations, patient clinical manifestations can include sensory disturbance, decreased deep tendon reflexes, dysarthria, peripheral neuropathy, axonal sensorimotor neuropathy, ataxia, cerebellar and spinal cord atrophy, leukoencephalopathy, elevated serum creatine kinase levels, ragged-red fibers, and cognitive impairment. COA7 loss-of-function has been shown to lead to the disruption of oxidative phosphorylation, with cytochrome c oxidase activity being the most affected complex. Pathogenic variations have been known to include D6G, S149I, G144fs, and Y137C amino acid changes in addition to a c.115C>T exon 2 deletion.

== Interactions ==
COA7 has been shown to have 27 binary protein-protein interactions including 16 co-complex interactions. COA7 appears to interact with EFHC1, SNRPB, SUOX, AES, ENKD1, and GPSM3.
