= COX8A =

Protein-coding gene in the species Homo sapiens

Identifiers
- Aliases: COX8A, COX, COX8, COX8-2, COX8L, VIII, VIII-L, cytochrome c oxidase subunit 8A, MC4DN15
- External IDs: OMIM: 123870; MGI: 105959; GeneCards: COX8A

Gene location (Human)
Chr.	Chromosome 11 (human)
Band	11q13.1	Start	63,974,620 bp
Band	11q13.1	End	63,976,543 bp

Gene location (Mouse)
Chr.	Chromosome 19 (mouse)
Band	19|19 A	Start	7,192,518 bp
Band	19|19 A	End	7,194,981 bp
RNA expression pattern
Bgee	Human / Mouse (ortholog); Top expressed in: apex of heart; mucosa of transverse colon; left ventricle; right auricle of heart; renal medulla; myocardium of left ventricle; gastrocnemius muscle; muscle of thigh; human kidney; right ventricle / Top expressed in: right kidney; superior frontal gyrus; primary visual cortex; dentate gyrus of hippocampal formation granule cell; cerebellar cortex; yolk sac; granulocyte; embryo; embryo; pyloric antrum; More reference expression data
BioGPS	n/a
Gene ontology
Molecular function	protein binding; cytochrome-c oxidase activity
Cellular component	integral component of membrane; mitochondrial inner membrane; mitochondrion; mitochondrial respiratory chain complex IV; membrane; respiratory chain complex IV
Biological process	generation of precursor metabolites and energy; mitochondrial electron transport, cytochrome c to oxygen; proton transmembrane transport; electron transport chain
Sources:Amigo / QuickGO
Orthologs
Databases	NCBI: entry; OMA: entry
Species	Human	Mouse
Entrez	1351	12868
Ensembl	ENSG00000176340	ENSMUSG00000035885
UniProt	P10176	Q64445
RefSeq (mRNA)	NM_004074	NM_007750
RefSeq (protein)	NP_004065	NP_031776
Location (UCSC)	Chr 11: 63.97 – 63.98 Mb	Chr 19: 7.19 – 7.19 Mb
PubMed search
- Wikidata
View/Edit Human	View/Edit Mouse

Cytochrome c oxidase subunit 8A (COX8A) is a protein that in humans is encoded by the COX8A gene. Cytochrome c oxidase 8A is a subunit of the cytochrome c oxidase complex, also known as Complex IV. Mutations in the COX8A gene have been associated with complex IV deficiency with Leigh syndrome and epilepsy.

== Structure ==
COX8A is a 7.6 kDa protein composed of 69 amino acids. This gene encodes the nuclear-encoded subunit 8A of the human mitochondrial respiratory chain enzyme complex cytochrome c oxidase. The complex consists of 13 mitochondrial- and nuclear-encoded subunits.

== Function ==
Cytochrome c oxidase (COX) is the terminal enzyme of the mitochondrial respiratory chain. It is a multi-subunit enzyme complex that couples the transfer of electrons from cytochrome c to molecular oxygen and contributes to a proton electrochemical gradient across the inner mitochondrial membrane. The mitochondrially-encoded subunits perform the electron transfer of proton pumping activities. The functions of the nuclear-encoded subunits are unknown but they may play a role in the regulation and assembly of the complex.

== Clinical significance ==
COX8A is a subunit of cytochrome c oxidase and its function is important for the efficacy of complex IV. Mutations in COX8A can affect complex IV of the electron transport chain, resulting in complex IV deficiency. This disorder can have a wide range of clinical manifestations including Leigh syndrome, leukodystrophy, and severe epilepsy.

== Interactions ==
COX8A has been shown to have 19 binary protein-protein interactions including 7 co-complex interactions. COX8A appears to interact with NPM1, MAGEA4, EDDM3B, BATF, AMBP, CREB1, and NCOR1.
