= PET117 =

Protein-coding gene in the species Homo sapiens

Identifiers
- Aliases: PET117, CSRP2BP, PET117 homolog, PET117 cytochrome c oxidase chaperone, MC4DN19
- External IDs: OMIM: 614771; MGI: 5295678; HomoloGene: 130056; GeneCards: PET117; OMA:PET117 - orthologs

Gene location (Human)
| Chr. | Chromosome 20 (human) |
| Band | 20p11.23 | Start | 18,137,863 bp |
| Band | 20p11.23 | End | 18,143,169 bp |

Gene location (Mouse)
| Chr. | Chromosome 2 (mouse) |
| Band | 2|2 G1 | Start | 144,210,916 bp |
| Band | 2|2 G1 | End | 144,215,641 bp |
RNA expression pattern
| Bgee | Human / Mouse (ortholog); Top expressed in: endothelial cell; gonad; pancreatic epithelial cell; jejunal mucosa; pancreatic ductal cell; retinal pigment epithelium; mucosa of transverse colon; Brodmann area 23; mucosa of ileum; germinal epithelium / Top expressed in: yolk sac; neural layer of retina; embryo; muscle of thigh; embryo; morula; lens; blastocyst; dentate gyrus of hippocampal formation granule cell; superior frontal gyrus; More reference expression data |
| BioGPS | n/a |
Orthologs
| Species | Human | Mouse |
| Entrez | 100303755 | 100048644 |
| Ensembl | ENSG00000232838 | ENSMUSG00000098387 |
| UniProt | Q6UWS5 | P0DJF2 |
| RefSeq (mRNA) | NM_001164811 | NM_001164813 |
| RefSeq (protein) | NP_001158283; NP_001158283.1 | NP_001158285 |
| Location (UCSC) | Chr 20: 18.14 – 18.14 Mb | Chr 2: 144.21 – 144.22 Mb |
| PubMed search |
- Wikidata
| View/Edit Human | View/Edit Mouse |

PET117 homolog is a protein that in humans is encoded by the PET117 gene. Localized to mitochondria, this protein is a chaperone protein involved in the assembly of mitochondrial Complex IV, or Cytochrome C Oxidase. Mutations in this gene can cause Complex IV deficiency with symptoms including medulla oblongata lesions and lactic acidosis.

== Structure ==
The PET117 gene is located on the p arm of chromosome 20 in position 11.23 and spans 5,314 base pairs. The gene produces a 9.2 kDa protein composed of 81 amino acids. PET117 localizes to mitochondria.

== Function ==
The protein encoded by PET117 is a chaperone protein involved in Complex IV biogenesis, interacting with MR-1S and possibly other Complex IV structural subunits. The presence of PET100 is required for this interaction.

== Clinical Significance ==
The only reported mutation in the PET117 gene was a homozygous nonsense mutation (c. 172 C>T) in two sister patients. Both were diagnosed with Complex IV deficiency and had lesions in their medulla oblongata, along with lactic acidosis. Symptoms in the older sister included abnormal motor development, regression in speech and motor skills after age ten, bradykinesia, hypokinesia, and pyramidal signs with positive Babinski response. The younger sister had protein losing enteropathy (PLE), recurrent respiratory infections, neutropenia, hypogammaglobulinemia, delayed motor and general development, and exercise intolerance.

== Interactions ==
PET117 interacts with MR-1S and possibly other Complex IV structural subunits. This interaction is dependent on the presence of PET100.
