= SURF1 =

Protein found in humans

Identifiers
- Aliases: SURF1, CMT4K, surfeit 1, cytochrome c oxidase assembly factor, SURF1 cytochrome c oxidase assembly factor, MC4DN1, SHY1
- External IDs: OMIM: 185620; MGI: 98443; GeneCards: SURF1

Gene location (Human)
Chr.	Chromosome 9 (human)
Band	9q34.2	Start	133,351,758 bp
Band	9q34.2	End	133,356,676 bp

Gene location (Mouse)
Chr.	Chromosome 2 (mouse)
Band	2 A3|2 19.1 cM	Start	26,803,393 bp
Band	2 A3|2 19.1 cM	End	26,806,542 bp
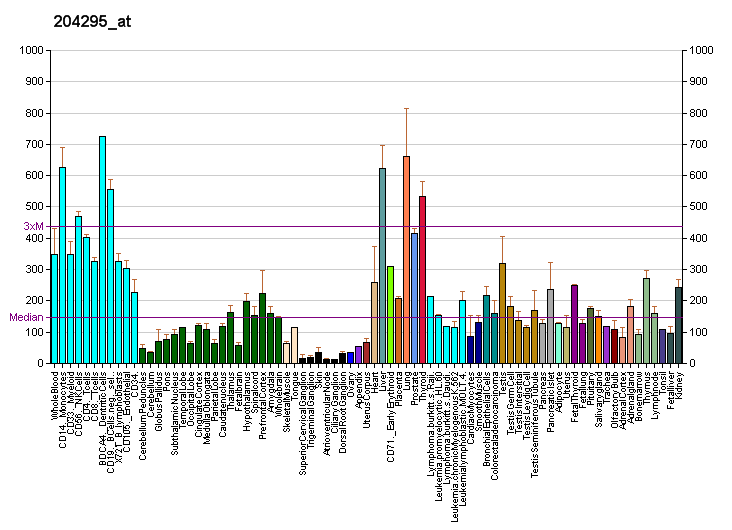
RNA expression pattern
Bgee	Human / Mouse (ortholog); Top expressed in: apex of heart; body of pancreas; right lobe of liver; body of stomach; mucosa of transverse colon; granulocyte; right adrenal gland; right adrenal cortex; muscle layer of sigmoid colon; left adrenal cortex / Top expressed in: facial motor nucleus; neural layer of retina; anterior horn of spinal cord; motor neuron; superior frontal gyrus; dentate gyrus of hippocampal formation granule cell; yolk sac; transitional epithelium of urinary bladder; right kidney; primary visual cortex; More reference expression data
BioGPS	More reference expression data
Gene ontology
Molecular function	cytochrome-c oxidase activity; protein binding
Cellular component	integral component of membrane; mitochondrial inner membrane; mitochondrion; membrane; mitochondrial respirasome
Biological process	proton transmembrane transport; aerobic dissimilation; oxidative phosphorylation; ATP biosynthetic process; respiratory chain complex IV assembly; mitochondrial cytochrome c oxidase assembly; electron transport chain
Sources:Amigo / QuickGO
Orthologs
Databases	NCBI: entry; OMA: entry
Species	Human	Mouse
Entrez	6834	20930
Ensembl	ENSG00000148290; ENSG00000280627	ENSMUSG00000015790
UniProt	Q15526	P09925
RefSeq (mRNA)	NM_001280787; NM_003172	NM_001271724; NM_013677
RefSeq (protein)	NP_001267716; NP_003163	NP_001258653; NP_038705
Location (UCSC)	Chr 9: 133.35 – 133.36 Mb	Chr 2: 26.8 – 26.81 Mb
PubMed search
- Wikidata
View/Edit Human	View/Edit Mouse

Surfeit locus protein 1 (SURF1) is a protein that in humans is encoded by the SURF1 gene. The protein encoded by SURF1 is a component of the mitochondrial translation regulation assembly intermediate of cytochrome c oxidase complex (MITRAC complex), which is involved in the regulation of cytochrome c oxidase assembly. Defects in this gene are a cause of Leigh syndrome, a severe neurological disorder that is commonly associated with systemic cytochrome c oxidase (complex IV) deficiency, and Charcot–Marie–Tooth disease 4K (CMT4K).

== Structure ==
SURF1 is located on the q arm of chromosome 9 in position 34.2 and has 9 exons. The SURF1 gene produces a 33.3 kDa protein composed of 300 amino acids. The protein is a member of the SURF1 family, which includes the related yeast protein SHY1 and rickettsial protein RP733. The gene is located in the surfeit gene cluster, a group of very tightly linked genes that do not share sequence similarity, where it shares a bidirectional promoter with SURF2 on the opposite strand. SURF1 is a multi-pass protein that contains two transmembrane regions, one 19 amino acids in length from positions 61–79 and the other 17 amino acids in length from positions 274–290.

== Function ==
This gene encodes a protein localized to the inner mitochondrial membrane and thought to be involved in the biogenesis of the cytochrome c oxidase complex. SURF1 is a multi-pass membrane protein component of the mitochondrial translation regulation assembly intermediate of cytochrome c oxidase complex (MITRAC complex). The MITRAC complex regulates cytochrome c oxidase assembly by acting as a central assembly intermediate, receiving subunits imported to the inner mitochondrial membrane and regulating COX1 mRNA translation.

== Clinical significance ==
Mutations in SURF1 have been associated with mitochondrial complex IV (cytochrome c oxidase) deficiency with clinical manifestations of Leigh syndrome and Charcot–Marie–Tooth disease 4K (CMT4K).

=== Mitochondrial complex IV deficiency ===
Mitochondrial complex IV deficiency is a disorder of the mitochondrial respiratory chain with heterogeneous clinical manifestations, ranging from isolated myopathy to severe multisystem disease affecting several tissues and organs. Features include hypertrophic cardiomyopathy, hepatomegaly and liver dysfunction, hypotonia, muscle weakness, exercise intolerance, developmental delay, delayed motor development and mental retardation. Some affected individuals manifest a fatal hypertrophic cardiomyopathy resulting in neonatal death. A subset of patients manifest Leigh syndrome. In patients presenting with pathogenic mutations resulting in dysfunctioning SURF1, cytochrome c oxidase activity is likely to be diminished in one or more types of tissues.

=== Leigh syndrome ===
Leigh syndrome is an early-onset progressive neurodegenerative disorder characterized by the presence of focal, bilateral lesions in one or more areas of the central nervous system including the brainstem, thalamus, basal ganglia, cerebellum and spinal cord. Clinical features depend on which areas of the central nervous system are involved and include subacute onset of psychomotor retardation, hypotonia, ataxia, weakness, vision loss, eye movement abnormalities, seizures, and dysphagia. There have been over 30 different mutations in SURF1 that have been associated with Leigh syndrome. These mutations, which comprise at least 10 missense or nonsense, 8 splice site, and 12 insertion or deletion mutations, are believed to be the result of dysfunctional SURF1 that results in Leigh syndrome and cytochrome c oxidase deficiency. The most common mutation is believed to be 312_321del 311_312insAT.

=== Charcot–Marie–Tooth disease 4K (CMT4K) ===
Charcot–Marie–Tooth disease 4K (CMT4K) is an autosomal recessive, demyelinating form of Charcot–Marie–Tooth disease, a disorder of the peripheral nervous system, characterized by progressive weakness and atrophy, initially of the peroneal muscles and later of the distal muscles of the arms. Charcot–Marie–Tooth disease is classified in two main groups on the basis of electrophysiologic properties and histopathology: primary peripheral demyelinating neuropathies (designated CMT1 when they are dominantly inherited) and primary peripheral axonal neuropathies (CMT2). Demyelinating neuropathies are characterized by severely reduced nerve conduction velocities (less than 38 m/sec), segmental demyelination and remyelination with onion bulb formations on nerve biopsy, slowly progressive distal muscle atrophy and weakness, absent deep tendon reflexes, and hollow feet. By convention, autosomal recessive forms of demyelinating Charcot–Marie–Tooth disease are designated CMT4. CMT4K patients manifest upper and lower limbs involvement. Some affected individuals have nystagmus, polyneuropathy, putaminal and periaqueductal lesions, and late-onset cerebellar ataxia. This disease, when associated with mutations in SURF1, has been found to be linked to cytochrome c oxidase deficiency. Variants associated with this CMT4K have included a homozygous splice site mutation, c.107-2A>G, a missense mutation, c.574C>T, and a deletion, c.799_800del.

== Interactions ==
SURF1 has been shown to have 11 binary protein-protein interactions including 8 co-complex interactions. SURF1 interacts with COA3 as part of the mitochondrial translation regulation assembly intermediate of cytochrome c oxidase complex (MITRAC complex). PTGES3, SLC25A5, COX6C, COX14, COA1 have all also been found to interact with SURF1.
