= COX5A =

Protein-coding gene in the species Homo sapiens

Identifiers
- Aliases: COX5A, COX, COX-VA, VA, cytochrome c oxidase subunit 5A, MC4DN20
- External IDs: OMIM: 603773; MGI: 88474; GeneCards: COX5A

Gene location (Human)
Chr.	Chromosome 15 (human)
Band	15q24.2	Start	74,919,791 bp
Band	15q24.2	End	74,938,083 bp

Gene location (Mouse)
Chr.	Chromosome 9 (mouse)
Band	9|9 B	Start	57,428,557 bp
Band	9|9 B	End	57,439,709 bp
RNA expression pattern
Bgee	Human / Mouse (ortholog); Top expressed in: right ventricle; left ventricle; biceps brachii; mucosa of sigmoid colon; mucosa of transverse colon; right auricle of heart; apex of heart; thoracic diaphragm; Skeletal muscle tissue of biceps brachii; jejunal mucosa / Top expressed in: atrioventricular valve; endocardial cushion; medial vestibular nucleus; deep cerebellar nuclei; tunica adventitia of aorta; lateral geniculate nucleus; intercostal muscle; myocardium of ventricle; pontine nuclei; lateral hypothalamus; More reference expression data
BioGPS	n/a
Gene ontology
Molecular function	electron transfer activity; protein binding; metal ion binding; cytochrome-c oxidase activity
Cellular component	myelin sheath; mitochondrion; membrane; mitochondrial inner membrane; mitochondrial respiratory chain complex IV
Biological process	proton transmembrane transport; mitochondrial electron transport, cytochrome c to oxygen
Sources:Amigo / QuickGO
Orthologs
Databases	NCBI: entry; OMA: entry
Species	Human	Mouse
Entrez	9377	12858
Ensembl	ENSG00000178741	ENSMUSG00000000088
UniProt	P20674	P12787
RefSeq (mRNA)	NM_004255	NM_007747
RefSeq (protein)	NP_004246	NP_031773
Location (UCSC)	Chr 15: 74.92 – 74.94 Mb	Chr 9: 57.43 – 57.44 Mb
PubMed search
- Wikidata
View/Edit Human	View/Edit Mouse

Cytochrome c oxidase subunit 5a is a protein that in humans is encoded by the COX5A gene. Cytochrome c oxidase 5A is a subunit of the cytochrome c oxidase complex, also known as Complex IV, the last enzyme in the mitochondrial electron transport chain.

== Structure ==
The COX5A gene, located on the q arm of chromosome 15 in position 24.1, is made up of 5 exons and is 17,880 base pairs in length. The COX5A protein weighs 17 kDa and is composed of 150 amino acids. The protein is a subunit of Complex IV, which consists of 13 mitochondrial- and nuclear-encoded subunits.

== Function ==
Cytochrome c oxidase (COX) is the terminal enzyme of the mitochondrial respiratory chain. It is a multi-subunit enzyme complex that couples the transfer of electrons from cytochrome c to molecular oxygen and contributes to a proton electrochemical gradient across the inner mitochondrial membrane to drive ATP synthesis via protonmotive force. The mitochondrially-encoded subunits perform the electron transfer of proton pumping activities. The functions of the nuclear-encoded subunits are unknown but they may play a role in the regulation and assembly of the complex.

Summary reaction:

4 Fe^{2+}-cytochrome c + 8 H^{+}_{in} + O_{2} → 4 Fe^{3+}-cytochrome c + 2 H_{2}O + 4 H^{+}_{out}

== Clinical significance ==
COX5A (this gene) and COX5B are involved in the regulation of cancer cell metabolism by Bcl-2. COX5A interacts specifically with Bcl-2, but not with other members of the Bcl-2 family, such as Bcl-xL, Bax or Bak.

The Trans-activator of transcription protein (Tat) of human immunodeficiency virus (HIV) inhibits cytochrome c oxidase (COX) activity in permeabilized mitochondria isolated from both mouse and human liver, heart, and brain samples.
