= COX7A2L =

Protein-coding gene in humans

Identifiers
- Aliases: COX7A2L, COX7AR, COX7RP, EB1, SIG81, cytochrome c oxidase subunit 7A2 like, SCAFI, SCAF1
- External IDs: OMIM: 605771; MGI: 106015; GeneCards: COX7A2L

Gene location (Human)
Chr.	Chromosome 2 (human)
Band	2p21	Start	42,333,546 bp
Band	2p21	End	42,425,088 bp

Gene location (Mouse)
Chr.	Chromosome 17 (mouse)
Band	17|17 E4	Start	83,809,347 bp
Band	17|17 E4	End	83,824,759 bp
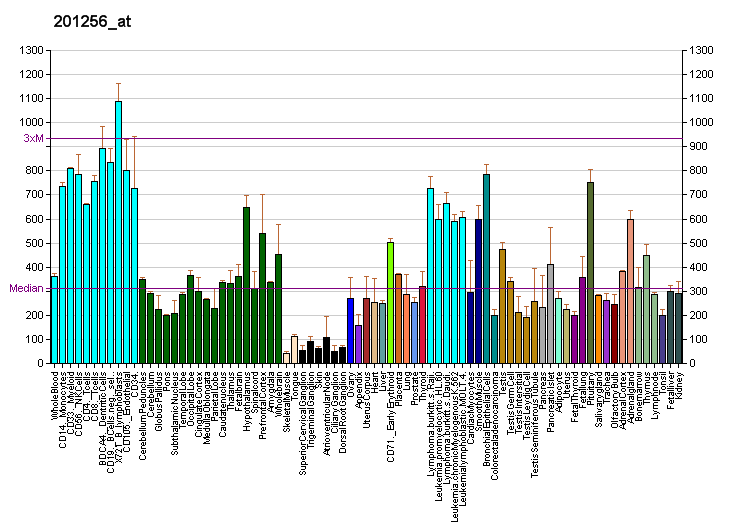
RNA expression pattern
Bgee	Human / Mouse (ortholog); Top expressed in: endothelial cell; right adrenal cortex; Achilles tendon; left adrenal gland; left adrenal cortex; islet of Langerhans; middle temporal gyrus; amniotic fluid; secondary oocyte; beta cell / Top expressed in: spleen; ganglionic eminence; uterus; bone marrow; pancreas; ventricular zone; thymus; islet of Langerhans; duodenum; lens; More reference expression data
BioGPS	More reference expression data
Gene ontology
Molecular function	electron transfer activity; cytochrome-c oxidase activity
Cellular component	mitochondrial inner membrane; membrane; mitochondrial respirasome; nucleolus; mitochondrion
Biological process	proton transmembrane transport; electron transport chain; regulation of oxidative phosphorylation; mitochondrial respirasome assembly; mitochondrial electron transport, cytochrome c to oxygen
Sources:Amigo / QuickGO
Orthologs
Databases	NCBI: entry; OMA: entry
Species	Human	Mouse
Entrez	9167	20463
Ensembl	ENSG00000115944	ENSMUSG00000024248
UniProt	O14548	Q61387
RefSeq (mRNA)	NM_004718; NM_001319036; NM_001319037; NM_001319038; NM_001319040	NM_001159529; NM_009187
RefSeq (protein)	NP_001305965; NP_001305966; NP_001305967; NP_001305969; NP_004709	NP_001153001; NP_033213
Location (UCSC)	Chr 2: 42.33 – 42.43 Mb	Chr 17: 83.81 – 83.82 Mb
PubMed search
- Wikidata
View/Edit Human	View/Edit Mouse

Cytochrome c oxidase subunit 7A-related protein, mitochondrial is an enzyme that in humans is encoded by the COX7A2L gene.

Cytochrome c oxidase (COX), the terminal component of the mitochondrial respiratory chain, catalyzes the electron transfer from reduced cytochrome c to oxygen. This component is a heteromeric complex consisting of 3 catalytic subunits encoded by mitochondrial genes and multiple structural subunits encoded by nuclear genes.

The mitochondrially-encoded subunits function in electron transfer, and the nuclear-encoded subunits may function in the regulation and assembly of the complex.

This nuclear gene encodes a protein similar to polypeptides 1 and 2 of subunit VIIa in the C-terminal region, and also highly similar to the mouse Sig81 protein sequence.

This gene is expressed in all tissues, and upregulated in a breast cancer cell line after estrogen treatment. It is possible that this gene represents a regulatory subunit of COX and mediates the higher level of energy production in target cells by estrogen.
