= COA3 =

Protein-coding gene in the species Homo sapiens

Identifiers
- Aliases: COA3, CCDC56, MITRAC12, HSPC009, cytochrome c oxidase assembly factor 3, COX25, MC4DN14, hCOA3
- External IDs: OMIM: 614775; MGI: 1098757; HomoloGene: 69156; GeneCards: COA3; OMA:COA3 - orthologs

Gene location (Human)
Chr.	Chromosome 17 (human)
Band	17q21.2	Start	42,795,147 bp
Band	17q21.2	End	42,798,704 bp

Gene location (Mouse)
Chr.	Chromosome 11 (mouse)
Band	11 D|11 64.56 cM	Start	101,168,794 bp
Band	11 D|11 64.56 cM	End	101,169,940 bp
RNA expression pattern
Bgee	Human / Mouse (ortholog); Top expressed in: mucosa of transverse colon; corpus epididymis; renal medulla; body of pancreas; mucosa of sigmoid colon; oral cavity; duodenum; body of stomach; gums; gingival epithelium / Top expressed in: facial motor nucleus; anterior horn of spinal cord; medullary collecting duct; islet of Langerhans; migratory enteric neural crest cell; epithelium of stomach; transitional epithelium of urinary bladder; lobe of prostate; medial ganglionic eminence; crypt of lieberkuhn of small intestine; More reference expression data
BioGPS	n/a
Gene ontology
Molecular function	protein binding
Cellular component	integral component of membrane; mitochondrial inner membrane; membrane; mitochondrion; integral component of mitochondrial inner membrane; mitochondrial respiratory chain complex IV
Biological process	mitochondrial cytochrome c oxidase assembly; positive regulation of mitochondrial translation
Sources:Amigo / QuickGO
Orthologs
Species	Human	Mouse
Entrez	28958	52469
Ensembl	ENSG00000183978	ENSMUSG00000017188
UniProt	Q9Y2R0	Q9D2R6
RefSeq (mRNA)	NM_001040431; NM_014019	NM_026618
RefSeq (protein)	NP_001035521	NP_080894
Location (UCSC)	Chr 17: 42.8 – 42.8 Mb	Chr 11: 101.17 – 101.17 Mb
PubMed search
- Wikidata
View/Edit Human	View/Edit Mouse

Cytochrome c oxidase assembly factor 3, also known as Coiled-coil domain-containing protein 56, or Mitochondrial translation regulation assembly intermediate of cytochrome c oxidase protein of 12 kDa is a protein that in humans is encoded by the COA3 gene. This gene encodes a member of the cytochrome c oxidase assembly factor family. Studies of a related gene in fly suggest that the encoded protein is localized to mitochondria and is essential for cytochrome c oxidase function.

== Structure ==
The COA3 gene is located on the q arm of chromosome 17 at position 21.2 and it spans 1,107 base pairs. The COA3 gene produces a 7.8 kDa protein composed of 71 amino acids. COA3 is a component of the enzyme MITRAC (mitochondrial translation regulation assembly intermediate of cytochrome c oxidase complex) complex, and the structure contains a C-terminal coiled-coil domain as well as a central single pass transmembrane domain.

== Function ==
The COA3 gene encodes for a Core protein of the MITRAC (mitochondrial translation regulation assembly intermediate of cytochrome c oxidase complex) complex. The MITRAC complex is essential in the assembly of cytochrome c oxidase (complex IV) of the mitochondrial respiratory chain, which is responsible for the catalysis of oxidation of cytochrome c by molecular oxygen. The MITRAC complex regulates both translation of mitochondrial encoded components and assembly of nuclear-encoded components imported in mitochondrion. In addition, COA3 is required for efficient translation of MT-CO1 and assembly of the mitochondrial respiratory chain complex IV.

== Clinical significance ==
Variants of COA3 have been associated with the mitochondrial Complex IV deficiency, a deficiency in an enzyme complex of the mitochondrial respiratory chain which catalyzes the oxidation of cytochrome c utilizing molecular oxygen. The deficiency is characterized by heterogeneous phenotypes ranging from isolated myopathy to severe multisystem disease affecting several tissues and organs. Other Clinical Manifestations include hypertrophic cardiomyopathy, hepatomegaly and liver dysfunction, hypotonia, muscle weakness, exercise intolerance, developmental delay, delayed motor development and intellectual disability. A missense mutation of c.215A>G in the COA3 gene has been found to result in a severe decrease in protein levels with symptoms of exercise intolerance and peripheral neuropathy.

== Interactions ==
Like COX14, COA3 is a key component of the MITRAC (mitochondrial translation regulation assembly intermediate of cytochrome c oxidase complex) complex. In addition, it has interactions with proteins such as MT-CO1, COX1, SMIM20, SURF1, TIMM21, and others.
