= COX6A1 =

Protein-coding gene in the species Homo sapiens

Identifiers
- Aliases: COX6A1, COX6A, COX6AL, CMTRID, cytochrome c oxidase subunit 6A1
- External IDs: OMIM: 602072; MGI: 103099; GeneCards: COX6A1

Gene location (Human)
Chr.	Chromosome 12 (human)
Band	12q24.31|12q24.2	Start	120,438,090 bp
Band	12q24.31|12q24.2	End	120,440,737 bp

Gene location (Mouse)
Chr.	Chromosome 5 (mouse)
Band	5 F|5 56.06 cM	Start	115,483,701 bp
Band	5 F|5 56.06 cM	End	115,487,040 bp
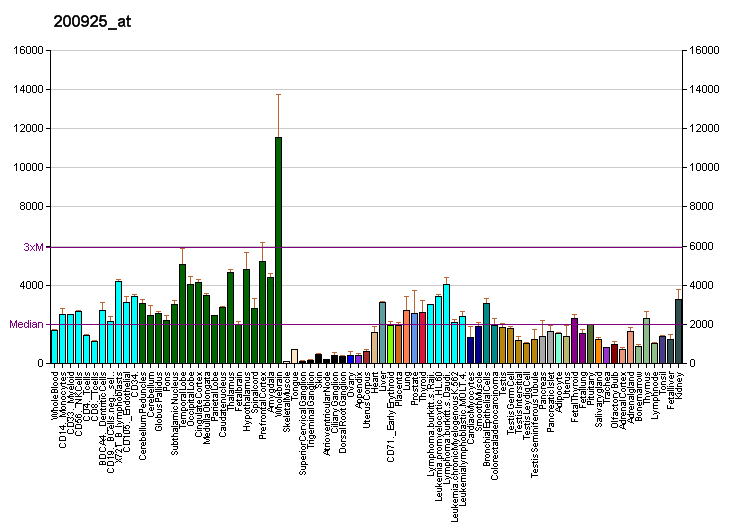
RNA expression pattern
Bgee	Human / Mouse (ortholog); Top expressed in: prefrontal cortex; primary visual cortex; amygdala; dorsolateral prefrontal cortex; Brodmann area 9; substantia nigra; superior frontal gyrus; hippocampus proper; anterior cingulate cortex; right frontal lobe / Top expressed in: migratory enteric neural crest cell; facial motor nucleus; condyle; tunica adventitia of aorta; Paneth cell; endocardial cushion; fossa; substantia nigra; epithelium of stomach; atrioventricular valve; More reference expression data
BioGPS	More reference expression data
Gene ontology
Molecular function	cytochrome-c oxidase activity; enzyme regulator activity
Cellular component	membrane; mitochondrial inner membrane; mitochondrion; mitochondrial respiratory chain complex IV; integral component of membrane
Biological process	generation of precursor metabolites and energy; proton transmembrane transport; mitochondrial electron transport, cytochrome c to oxygen; aerobic dissimilation; regulation of catalytic activity; electron transport chain
Sources:Amigo / QuickGO
Orthologs
Databases	NCBI: entry; OMA: entry
Species	Human	Mouse
Entrez	1337	12861
Ensembl	ENSG00000111775	ENSMUSG00000041697
UniProt	P12074	P43024
RefSeq (mRNA)	NM_004373	NM_007748
RefSeq (protein)	NP_004364; NP_004364.2	NP_031774
Location (UCSC)	Chr 12: 120.44 – 120.44 Mb	Chr 5: 115.48 – 115.49 Mb
PubMed search
- Wikidata
View/Edit Human	View/Edit Mouse

Cytochrome c oxidase subunit 6A1, mitochondrial is a protein that in humans is encoded by the COX6A1 gene. Cytochrome c oxidase 6A1 is a subunit of the cytochrome c oxidase complex, also known as Complex IV, the last enzyme in the mitochondrial electron transport chain. A mutation of the COX6A1 gene is associated with a recessive axonal or mixed form of Charcot-Marie-Tooth disease.

== Structure ==
The COX6A1 gene, located on the q arm of chromosome 12 in position 24.2, contains 3 exons and is 2,653 base pairs in length. The COX6A1 protein weighs 12 kDa and is composed of 109 amino acids. The protein is a subunit of Complex IV, a heteromeric complex consisting of 3 catalytic subunits encoded by mitochondrial genes and multiple structural subunits encoded by nuclear genes. This nuclear gene encodes polypeptide 1 (liver isoform) of subunit VIa, and polypeptide 1 is found in all non-muscle tissues. Polypeptide 2 (heart/muscle isoform) of subunit VIa is encoded by a different gene, COX6A2, and is present only in striated muscles. These two polypeptides share 66% amino acid sequence identity.

== Function ==
Cytochrome c oxidase (COX) is the terminal enzyme of the mitochondrial respiratory chain. It is a multi-subunit enzyme complex that couples the transfer of electrons from cytochrome c to molecular oxygen and contributes to a proton electrochemical gradient across the inner mitochondrial membrane to drive ATP synthesis via protonmotive force. The mitochondrially-encoded subunits perform the electron transfer of proton pumping activities. The functions of the nuclear-encoded subunits are unknown but they may play a role in the regulation and assembly of the complex.

Summary reaction:

4 Fe^{2+}-cytochrome c + 8 H^{+}_{in} + O_{2} → 4 Fe^{3+}-cytochrome c + 2 H_{2}O + 4 H^{+}_{out}

== Clinical significance ==
A mutation leading to a 5 base pair deletion in the COX6A1 gene is associated with Charcot-Marie-Tooth disease (CMT). CMT is the most common inherited neuropathy and can result from mutations in over 30 different loci. Expression of COX6A1 is significantly reduced in affected individuals.

The Trans-activator of transcription protein (Tat) of human immunodeficiency virus (HIV) inhibits cytochrome c oxidase (COX) activity in permeabilized mitochondria isolated from both mouse and human liver, heart, and brain samples. Rapid loss of membrane potential (ΔΨ_{m}) occurs with submicromolar doses of Tat, and cytochrome c is released from the mitochondria.
