= COX5B =

Protein-coding gene in humans

Identifiers
- Aliases: COX5B, cytochrome c oxidase subunit Vb, COXVB, cytochrome c oxidase subunit 5B
- External IDs: OMIM: 123866; MGI: 88475; GeneCards: COX5B

Gene location (Human)
Chr.	Chromosome 2 (human)
Band	2q11.2	Start	97,646,062 bp
Band	2q11.2	End	97,648,383 bp

Gene location (Mouse)
Chr.	Chromosome 1 (mouse)
Band	1|1 B	Start	36,730,530 bp
Band	1|1 B	End	36,732,762 bp
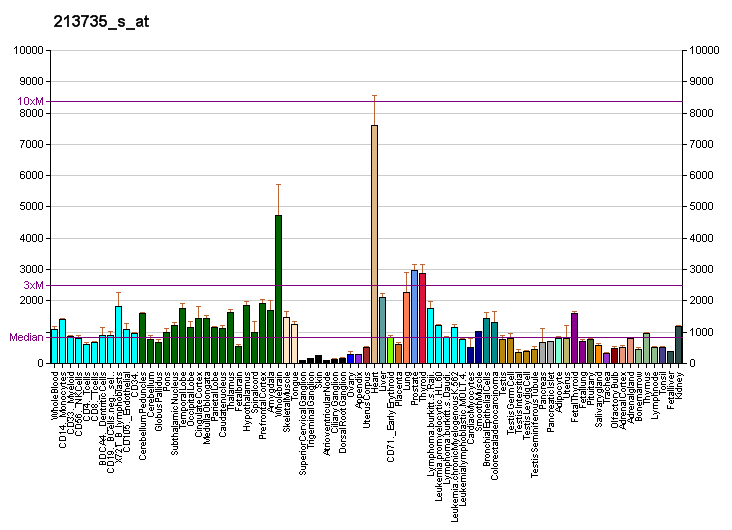

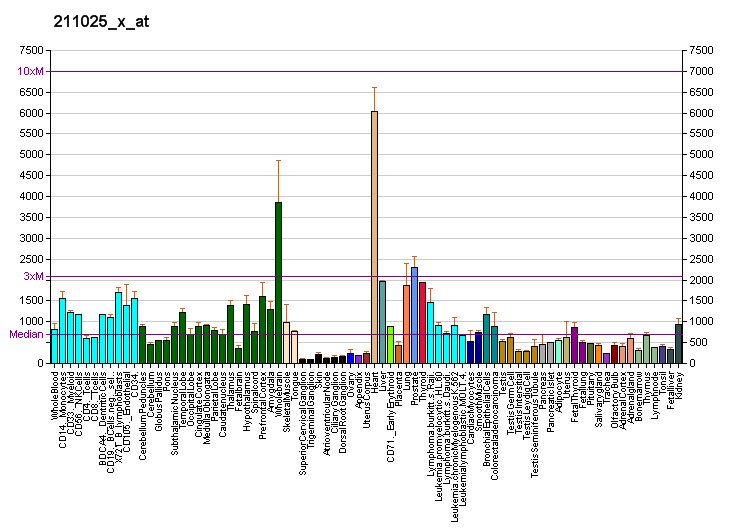

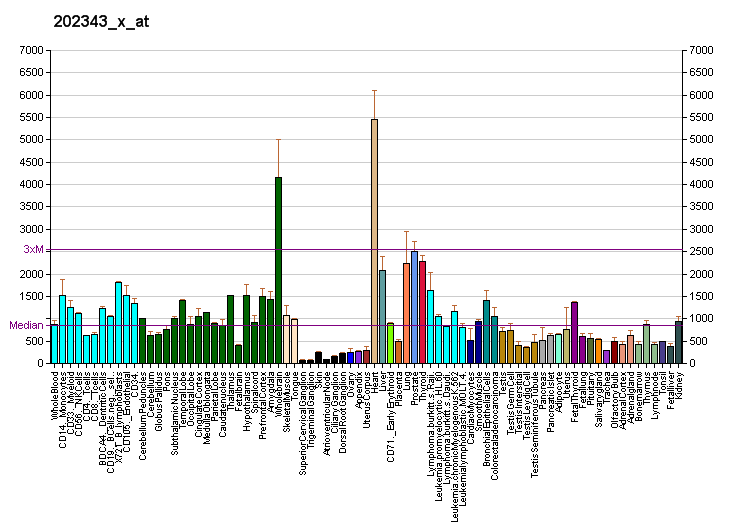
RNA expression pattern
Bgee	Human / Mouse (ortholog); Top expressed in: right ventricle; apex of heart; vastus lateralis muscle; left ventricle; Skeletal muscle tissue of biceps brachii; body of tongue; lateral nuclear group of thalamus; Skeletal muscle tissue of rectus abdominis; triceps brachii muscle; renal medulla / Top expressed in: right kidney; dentate gyrus of hippocampal formation granule cell; neural layer of retina; muscle of thigh; superior frontal gyrus; primary visual cortex; lip; yolk sac; embryo; embryo; More reference expression data
BioGPS	More reference expression data
Gene ontology
Molecular function	protein binding; metal ion binding; cytochrome-c oxidase activity
Cellular component	mitochondrial inner membrane; mitochondrial envelope; mitochondrion; membrane; mitochondrial respiratory chain complex IV
Biological process	respiratory gaseous exchange by respiratory system; mitochondrial electron transport, cytochrome c to oxygen; mitochondrial ATP synthesis coupled proton transport
Sources:Amigo / QuickGO
Orthologs
Databases	NCBI: entry; OMA: entry
Species	Human	Mouse
Entrez	1329	12859
Ensembl	ENSG00000135940	ENSMUSG00000061518
UniProt	P10606	P19536
RefSeq (mRNA)	NM_001862	NM_009942
RefSeq (protein)	NP_001853	n/a
Location (UCSC)	Chr 2: 97.65 – 97.65 Mb	Chr 1: 36.73 – 36.73 Mb
PubMed search
- Wikidata
View/Edit Human	View/Edit Mouse

Cytochrome c oxidase subunit Vb
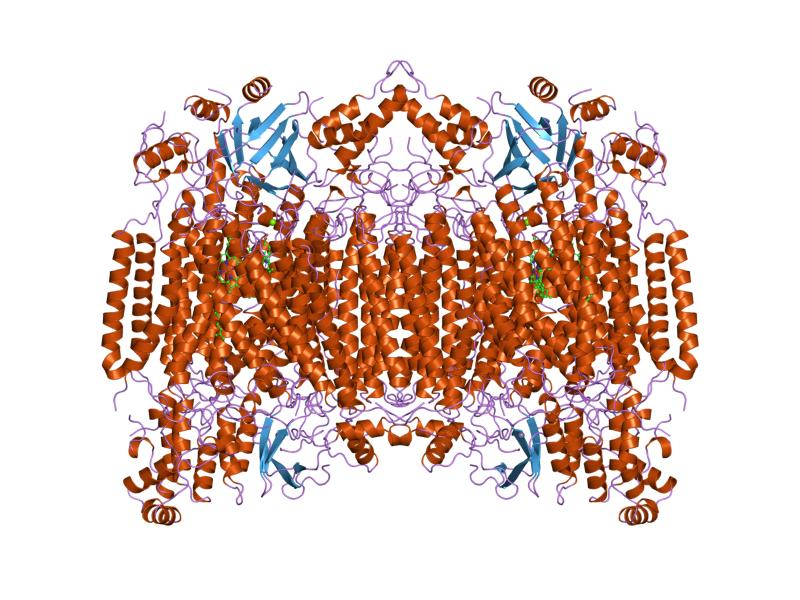
- Structure of the 13-subunit oxidized cytochrome c oxidase

Identifiers
- Symbol: COX5B
- Pfam: PF01215
- InterPro: IPR002124
- PROSITE: PDOC00663
- SCOP2: 1occ / SCOPe / SUPFAM
- OPM superfamily: 4
- OPM protein: 1v55
- CDD: cd00924
Available protein structures:
- PDB: 1v55S:30-98 1occS:30-98 1v54F:30-98 1ocoF:30-98 1oczS:30-98 1ocrF:30-98 2occS:30-98 IPR002124 PF01215 (ECOD; PDBsum)
- AlphaFold: IPR002124; PF01215

Cytochrome c oxidase subunit 5B, mitochondrial is an enzyme in humans that is a subunit of the cytochrome c oxidase complex, also known as Complex IV, the last enzyme in the mitochondrial electron transport chain. In humans, cytochrome c oxidase subunit 5B is encoded by the COX5B gene.

== Structure ==
The enzyme weighs 14 kDa and is composed of 129 amino acids. The protein is a subunit of Complex IV, which consists of 13 mitochondrial- and nuclear-encoded subunits. The sequence of subunit Vb is well conserved and includes three conserved cysteines that coordinate the zinc ion. Two of these cysteines are clustered in the C-terminal section of the subunit.

== Gene ==
The COX5B gene, located on the q arm of chromosome 2 in position 11.2, is made up of 4 exons and is 2,137 base pairs in length.

== Function ==
Cytochrome c oxidase (COX) is the terminal enzyme of the mitochondrial respiratory chain. It is a multi-subunit enzyme complex that couples the transfer of electrons from cytochrome c to oxygen and contributes to a proton electrochemical gradient across the inner mitochondrial membrane to drive ATP synthesis via protonmotive force. The mitochondrially-encoded subunits perform the electron transfer of proton pumping activities. The functions of the nuclear-encoded subunits are unknown but they may play a role in the regulation and assembly of the complex.

Summary reaction:

4 Fe^{2+}-cytochrome c + 8 H^{+}_{in} + O_{2} → 4 Fe^{3+}-cytochrome c + 2 H_{2}O + 4 H^{+}_{out}

== Clinical significance ==
COX5A and COX5B are involved in the regulation of cancer cell metabolism by Bcl-2.

The Trans-activator of transcription protein (Tat) of human immunodeficiency virus (HIV) inhibits cytochrome c oxidase (COX) activity in permeabilized mitochondria isolated from both mouse and human liver, heart, and brain samples.

== Interactions ==
COX5B has been shown to interact with androgen receptor.
