= Cytochrome c oxidase =

Aerobic respiration enzyme

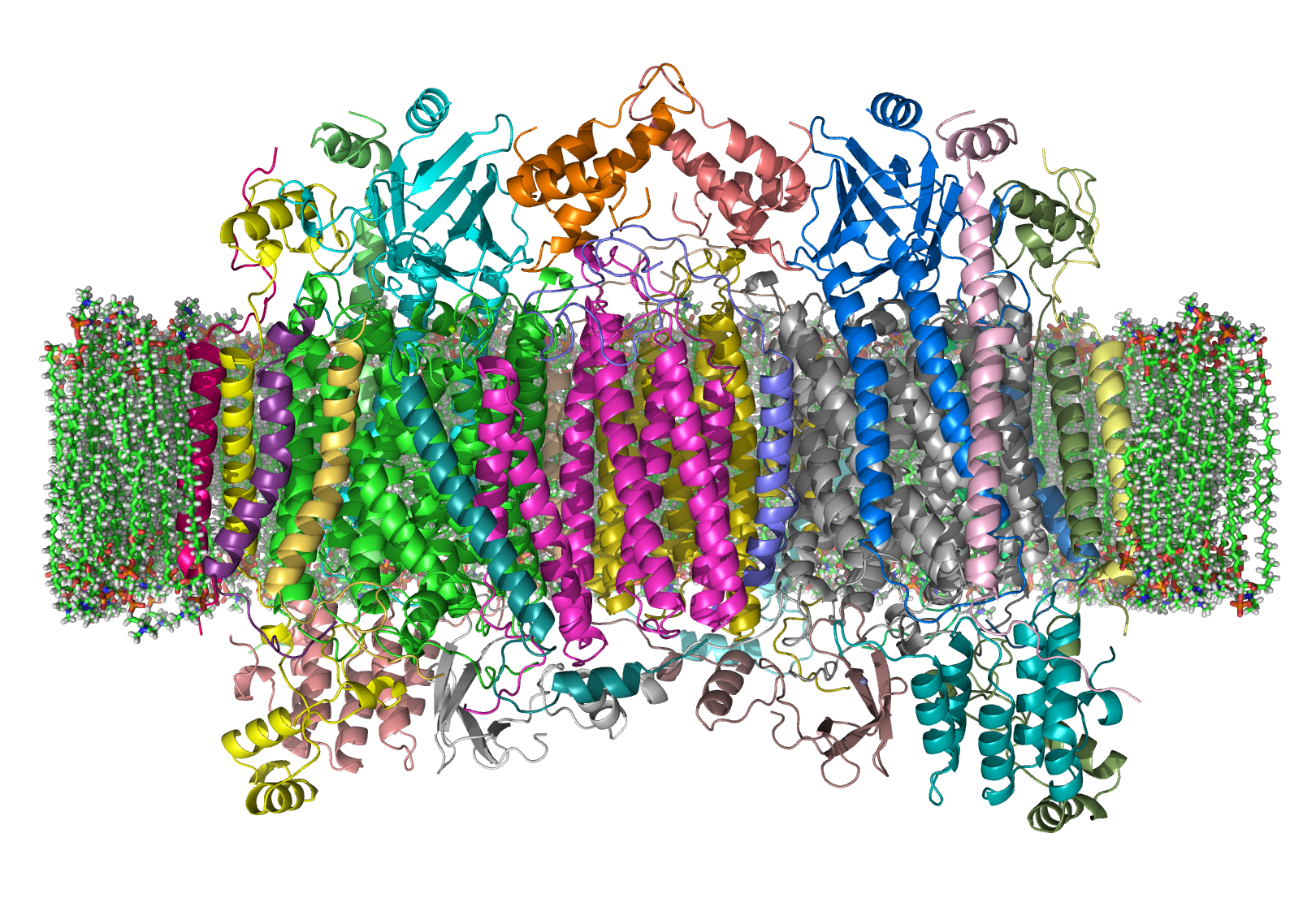
- The crystal structure of bovine cytochrome c oxidase in a phospholipid bilayer. The intermembrane space lies to top of the image. Adapted from PDB: 1OCC (it is a homodimer in this structure).

Identifiers
- EC no.: 1.9.3.1
- CAS no.: 9001-16-5

Databases
- BRENDA: enzyme data
- ExPASy: NiceZyme view
- KEGG: enzyme entry
- MetaCyc: metabolic pathway
- Rhea: reactions
- PDB structures: RCSB PDB PDBe PDBsum
- Gene Ontology: AmiGO / QuickGO
Search
- PMC: articles
- PubMed: articles
- NCBI: proteins

Cytochrome c oxidase
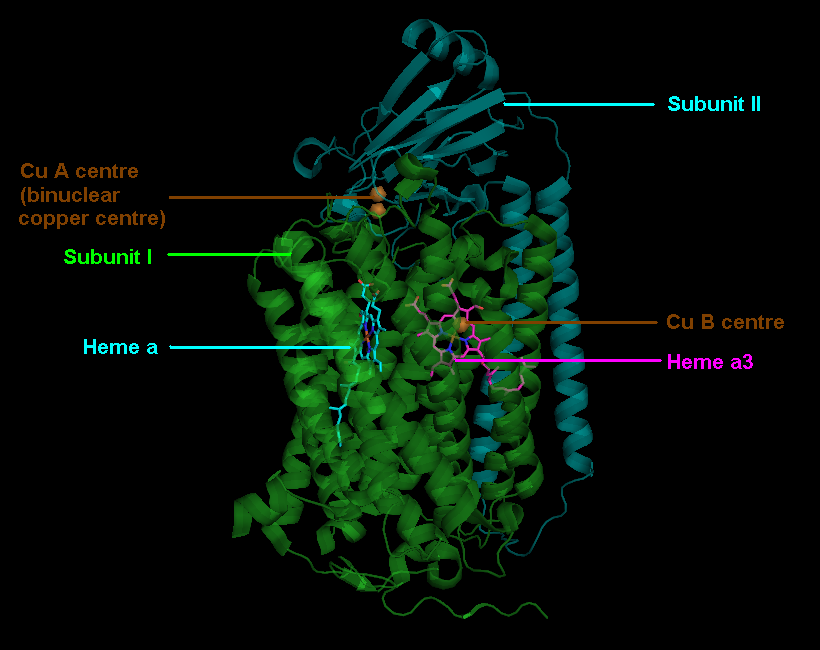
- Subunit I and II of Complex IV excluding all other subunits, PDB: 2EIK

Identifiers
- Symbol: Cytochrome c oxidase
- OPM superfamily: 4
- OPM protein: 2dyr
- Membranome: 257

The enzyme cytochrome c oxidase or Complex IV (was EC 1.9.3.1, now reclassified as a translocase EC 7.1.1.9) is a large transmembrane protein complex found in bacteria, archaea, and the mitochondria of eukaryotes, including humans.

It is the last enzyme in the respiratory electron transport chain of cells located in the membrane. It receives an electron from each of four cytochrome c proteins and transfers them to one oxygen molecule and four protons, producing two molecules of water. In addition to binding the four protons from the inner aqueous phase, it transports another four protons across the membrane, increasing the transmembrane difference of proton electrochemical potential, which the ATP synthase then uses to synthesize ATP.

== Structure ==
=== The complex ===
The complex is a large integral membrane protein composed of several metal prosthetic sites and 13 protein subunits in mammals. In mammals, ten subunits are nuclear in origin, and three are synthesized in the mitochondria. The complex contains two hemes, a cytochrome a and cytochrome a_{3}, and two copper centers, the Cu_{A} and Cu_{B} centers. In fact, the cytochrome a_{3} and Cu_{B} form a binuclear center that is the site of oxygen reduction. Cytochrome c, which is reduced by the preceding component of the respiratory chain (cytochrome bc1 complex, Complex III), docks near the Cu_{A} binuclear center and passes an electron to it, being oxidized back to cytochrome c containing Fe^{3+}. The reduced Cu_{A} binuclear center now passes an electron on to cytochrome a, which in turn passes an electron on to the cytochrome a_{3}>-Cu_{B} binuclear center. The two metal ions in this binuclear center are 4.5 Å apart and coordinate a hydroxide ion in the fully oxidized state.

Crystallographic studies of cytochrome c oxidase show an unusual post-translational modification, linking C6 of Tyr(244) and the ε-N of His(240) (bovine enzyme numbering). It plays a vital role in enabling the cytochrome a_{3}- Cu_{B} binuclear center to accept four electrons in reducing molecular oxygen and four protons to water. The mechanism of reduction was formerly thought to involve a peroxide intermediate, which was believed to lead to superoxide production. However, the currently accepted mechanism involves a rapid four-electron reduction involving immediate oxygen–oxygen bond cleavage, avoiding any intermediate likely to form superoxide.

=== The conserved subunits ===
Table of conserved subunits of cytochrome c oxidase complex
No.	Subunit name	Human protein	Protein description from UniProt	Pfam family with Human protein
1	Cox1	COX1_HUMAN	Cytochrome c oxidase subunit 1	Pfam PF00115
2	Cox2	COX2_HUMAN	Cytochrome c oxidase subunit 2	Pfam PF02790, Pfam PF00116
3	Cox3	COX3_HUMAN	Cytochrome c oxidase subunit 3	Pfam PF00510
4	Cox4i1	COX41_HUMAN	Cytochrome c oxidase subunit 4 isoform 1, mitochondrial	Pfam PF02936
5	Cox4a2	COX42_HUMAN	Cytochrome c oxidase subunit 4 isoform 2, mitochondrial	Pfam PF02936
6	Cox5a	COX5A_HUMAN	Cytochrome c oxidase subunit 5A, mitochondrial	Pfam PF02284
7	Cox5b	COX5B_HUMAN	Cytochrome c oxidase subunit 5B, mitochondrial	Pfam PF01215
8	Cox6a1	CX6A1_HUMAN	Cytochrome c oxidase subunit 6A1, mitochondrial	Pfam PF02046
9	Cox6a2	CX6A2_HUMAN	Cytochrome c oxidase subunit 6A2, mitochondrial	Pfam PF02046
10	Cox6b1	CX6B1_HUMAN	Cytochrome c oxidase subunit 6B1	Pfam PF02297
11	Cox6b2	CX6B2_HUMAN	Cytochrome c oxidase subunit 6B2	Pfam PF02297
12	Cox6c	COX6C_HUMAN	Cytochrome c oxidase subunit 6C	Pfam PF02937
13	Cox7a1	CX7A1_HUMAN	Cytochrome c oxidase subunit 7A1, mitochondrial	Pfam PF02238
14	Cox7a2	CX7A2_HUMAN	Cytochrome c oxidase subunit 7A2, mitochondrial	Pfam PF02238
15	Cox7a3	COX7S_HUMAN	Putative cytochrome c oxidase subunit 7A3, mitochondrial	Pfam PF02238
16	Cox7b	COX7B_HUMAN	Cytochrome c oxidase subunit 7B, mitochondrial	Pfam PF05392
17	Cox7c	COX7C_HUMAN	Cytochrome c oxidase subunit 7C, mitochondrial	Pfam PF02935
18	Cox7r	COX7R_HUMAN	Cytochrome c oxidase subunit 7A-related protein, mitochondrial	Pfam PF02238
19	Cox8a	COX8A_HUMAN	Cytochrome c oxidase subunit 8A, mitochondrial P	Pfam PF02285
20	Cox8c	COX8C_HUMAN	Cytochrome c oxidase subunit 8C, mitochondrial	Pfam PF02285
Assembly subunits
1	Coa1	COA1_HUMAN	Cytochrome c oxidase assembly factor 1 homolog	Pfam PF08695
2	Coa3	COA3_HUMAN	Cytochrome c oxidase assembly factor 3 homolog, mitochondrial	Pfam PF09813
3	Coa4	COA4_HUMAN	Cytochrome c oxidase assembly factor 4 homolog, mitochondrial	Pfam PF06747
4	Coa5	COA5_HUMAN	Cytochrome c oxidase assembly factor 5	Pfam PF10203
5	Coa6	COA6_HUMAN	Cytochrome c oxidase assembly factor 6 homolog	Pfam PF02297
6	Coa7	COA7_HUMAN	Cytochrome c oxidase assembly factor 7,	Pfam PF08238
7	Cox11	COX11_HUMAN	Cytochrome c oxidase assembly protein COX11 mitochondrial	Pfam PF04442
8	Cox14	COX14_HUMAN	Cytochrome c oxidase assembly protein	Pfam PF14880
9	Cox15	COX15_HUMAN	Cytochrome c oxidase assembly protein COX15 homolog	Pfam PF02628
10	Cox16	COX16_HUMAN	Cytochrome c oxidase assembly protein COX16 homolog mitochondrial	Pfam PF14138
11	Cox17	COX17_HUMAN	Cytochrome c oxidase copper chaperone	Pfam PF05051
12	Cox18	COX18_HUMAN	Mitochondrial inner membrane protein (Cytochrome c oxidase assembly protein 18)	Pfam PF02096
13	Cox19	COX19_HUMAN	Cytochrome c oxidase assembly protein	Pfam PF06747
14	Cox20	COX20_HUMAN	Cytochrome c oxidase protein 20 homolog	Pfam PF12597

== Assembly ==
Cytochrome c oxidase (COX) assembly in yeast are a complex process that is not entirely understood due to the rapid and irreversible aggregation of hydrophobic subunits that form the holoenzyme complex, as well as aggregation of mutant subunits with exposed hydrophobic patches. COX subunits are encoded in both the nuclear and mitochondrial genomes. The three subunits that form the COX catalytic core are encoded in the mitochondrial genome. Over 30 different nuclear-encoded chaperone proteins are required for COX assembly.

Cofactors, including hemes, are inserted into subunits I and II. The two heme molecules reside in subunit I, helping with transport to subunit II where two copper molecules aid with the continued transfer of electrons. Subunits I and IV initiate assembly. Different subunits may associate to form sub-complex intermediates that later bind to other subunits to form the COX complex. In post-assembly modifications, COX will form a homodimer. This is required for activity. Dimers are connected by a cardiolipin molecule, which has been found to play a key role in stabilization of the holoenzyme complex. The dissociation of subunits VIIa and III in conjunction with the removal of cardiolipin results in total loss of enzyme activity. Subunits encoded in the nuclear genome are known to play a role in enzyme dimerization and stability. Mutations to these subunits eliminate COX function.

Assembly is known to occur in at least three distinct rate-determining steps. The products of these steps have been found, though specific subunit compositions have not been determined.

Synthesis and assembly of COX subunits I, II, and III are facilitated by translational activators, which interact with the 5’ untranslated regions of mitochondrial mRNA transcripts. Translational activators are encoded in the nucleus. They can operate through either direct or indirect interaction with other components of translation machinery, but exact molecular mechanisms are unclear due to difficulties associated with synthesizing translation machinery in-vitro. Though the interactions between subunits I, II, and III encoded within the mitochondrial genome make a lesser contribution to enzyme stability than interactions between bigenomic subunits, these subunits are more conserved, indicating potential unexplored roles for enzyme activity.

== Biochemistry ==
The overall reaction is

4 Fe^{2+} – cytochrome c + 4 H^{+} + O_{2} → 4 Fe^{3+} – cytochrome c + 2 H_{2}O ΔG^{o}' = - 218 kJ/mol, E^{o}' = +565 mV

Two electrons are passed from two cytochrome c's, through the Cu_{A} and cytochrome a sites to the cytochrome a_{3}–Cu_{B} binuclear center, reducing the metals to the Fe^{2+} form and Cu^{+}. The hydroxide ligand is protonated and lost as water, creating a void between the metals that is filled by O_{2}. The oxygen is rapidly reduced, with two electrons coming from the Fe^{2+}-cytochrome a_{3}, which is converted to the ferryl oxo form (Fe^{4+}=O). The oxygen atom close to Cu_{B} picks up one electron from Cu^{+}, and a second electron and a proton from the hydroxyl of Tyr(244), which becomes a tyrosyl radical. The second oxygen is converted to a hydroxide ion by picking up two electrons and a proton. A third electron from another cytochrome c is passed through the first two electron carriers to the cytochrome a_{3}–Cu_{B} binuclear center, and this electron and two protons convert the tyrosyl radical back to Tyr, and the hydroxide bound to Cu_{B}^{2+} to a water molecule. The fourth electron from another cytochrome c flows through Cu_{A} and cytochrome a to the cytochrome a_{3}–Cu_{B} binuclear center, reducing the Fe^{4+}=O to Fe^{3+}, with the oxygen atom picking up a proton simultaneously, regenerating this oxygen as a hydroxide ion coordinated in the middle of the cytochrome a_{3}–Cu_{B} center as it was at the start of this cycle. Overall, four reduced cytochrome c's are oxidized while O_{2} and four protons are reduced to two water molecules.

== Inhibition ==
COX exists in three conformational states: fully oxidized (pulsed), partially reduced, and fully reduced. Each inhibitor has a high affinity to a different state. In the pulsed state, both the heme a_{3} and the Cu_{B} nuclear centers are oxidized; this is the conformation of the enzyme that has the highest activity. A two-electron reduction initiates a conformational change that allows oxygen to bind at the active site to the partially-reduced enzyme. Four electrons bind to COX to fully reduce the enzyme. Its fully reduced state, which consists of a reduced Fe^{2+} at the cytochrome a_{3} heme group and a reduced Cu_{B}^{+} binuclear center, is considered the inactive or resting state of the enzyme.

Cyanide, azide, and carbon monoxide all bind to cytochrome c oxidase, inhibiting the protein from functioning and leading to the chemical asphyxiation of cells. Higher concentrations of molecular oxygen are needed to compensate for increasing inhibitor concentrations, leading to an overall decrease in metabolic activity in the cell in the presence of an inhibitor. Other ligands, such as nitric oxide and hydrogen sulfide, can also inhibit COX by binding to regulatory sites on the enzyme, reducing the rate of cellular respiration.

Cyanide is a non-competitive inhibitor for COX, binding with high affinity to the partially-reduced state of the enzyme and hindering further reduction of the enzyme. In the pulsed state, cyanide binds slowly, but with high affinity. The ligand is posited to electrostatically stabilize both metals at once by positioning itself between them. A high nitric oxide concentration, such as one added exogenously to the enzyme, reverses cyanide inhibition of COX.

Nitric oxide can reversibly bind to either metal ion in the binuclear center to be oxidized to nitrite. NO and CN^{−} will compete with oxygen to bind at the site, reducing the rate of cellular respiration. Endogenous NO, however, which is produced at lower levels, augments CN^{−} inhibition. Higher levels of NO, which correlate with the existence of more enzyme in the reduced state, lead to a greater inhibition of cyanide. At these basal concentrations, NO inhibition of Complex IV is known to have beneficial effects, such as increasing oxygen levels in blood vessel tissues. The inability of the enzyme to reduce oxygen to water results in a buildup of oxygen, which can diffuse deeper into surrounding tissues. NO inhibition of Complex IV has a larger effect at lower oxygen concentrations, increasing its utility as a vasodilator in tissues of need.

Hydrogen sulfide will bind COX in a noncompetitive fashion at a regulatory site on the enzyme, similar to carbon monoxide. Sulfide has the highest affinity to either the pulsed or partially reduced states of the enzyme, and is capable of partially reducing the enzyme at the heme a_{3} center. It is unclear whether endogenous H_{2}S levels are sufficient to inhibit the enzyme. There is no interaction between hydrogen sulfide and the fully reduced conformation of COX.

Methanol in methylated spirits is converted into formic acid, which also inhibits the same oxidase system. High levels of ATP can allosterically inhibit cytochrome c oxidase, binding from within the mitochondrial matrix.

== Extramitochondrial and subcellular localizations ==
Location of the three cytochrome c oxidase subunit genes in the human mitochondrial genome: COXI, COXII, and COXIII (orange boxes)

Cytochrome c oxidase has three subunits which are encoded by mitochondrial DNA (cytochrome c oxidase subunit I, subunit II, and subunit III). Of these three subunits encoded by mitochondrial DNA, two have been identified in extramitochondrial locations. In pancreatic acinar tissue, these subunits were found in zymogen granules. Additionally, in the anterior pituitary, relatively high amounts of these subunits were found in growth hormone secretory granules. The extramitochondrial function of these cytochrome c oxidase subunits has not yet been characterized. Besides cytochrome c oxidase subunits, extramitochondrial localization has also been observed for large numbers of other mitochondrial proteins. This raises the possibility about existence of yet unidentified specific mechanisms for protein translocation from mitochondria to other cellular destinations.

== Genetic defects and disorders ==
Defects involving genetic mutations altering cytochrome c oxidase (COX) functionality or structure can result in severe, often fatal metabolic disorders. Such disorders usually manifest in early childhood and affect predominantly tissues with high energy demands (brain, heart, muscle). Among the many classified mitochondrial diseases, those involving dysfunctional COX assembly are thought to be the most severe.

The vast majority of COX disorders are linked to mutations in nuclear-encoded proteins referred to as assembly factors, or assembly proteins. These assembly factors contribute to COX structure and functionality, and are involved in several essential processes, including transcription and translation of mitochondrion-encoded subunits, processing of preproteins and membrane insertion, and cofactor biosynthesis and incorporation.

Currently, mutations have been identified in seven COX assembly factors: SURF1, SCO1, SCO2, COX10, COX15, COX20, COA5 and LRPPRC. Mutations in these proteins can result in altered functionality of sub-complex assembly, copper transport, or translational regulation. Each gene mutation is associated with the etiology of a specific disease, with some having implications in multiple disorders. Disorders involving dysfunctional COX assembly via gene mutations include Leigh syndrome, cardiomyopathy, leukodystrophy, anemia, and sensorineural deafness.

== Histochemistry ==
The increased reliance of neurons on oxidative phosphorylation for energy facilitates the use of COX histochemistry in mapping regional brain metabolism in animals, since it establishes a direct and positive correlation between enzyme activity and neuronal activity. This can be seen in the correlation between COX enzyme amount and activity, which indicates the regulation of COX at the level of gene expression. COX distribution is inconsistent across different regions of the animal brain, but its pattern of its distribution is consistent across animals. This pattern has been observed in the monkey, mouse, and calf brain. One isozyme of COX has been consistently detected in histochemical analysis of the brain. Such brain mapping has been accomplished in spontaneous mutant mice with cerebellar disease such as reeler and a transgenic model of Alzheimer's disease. This technique has also been used to map learning activity in the animal brain.

== Additional images ==
ETC

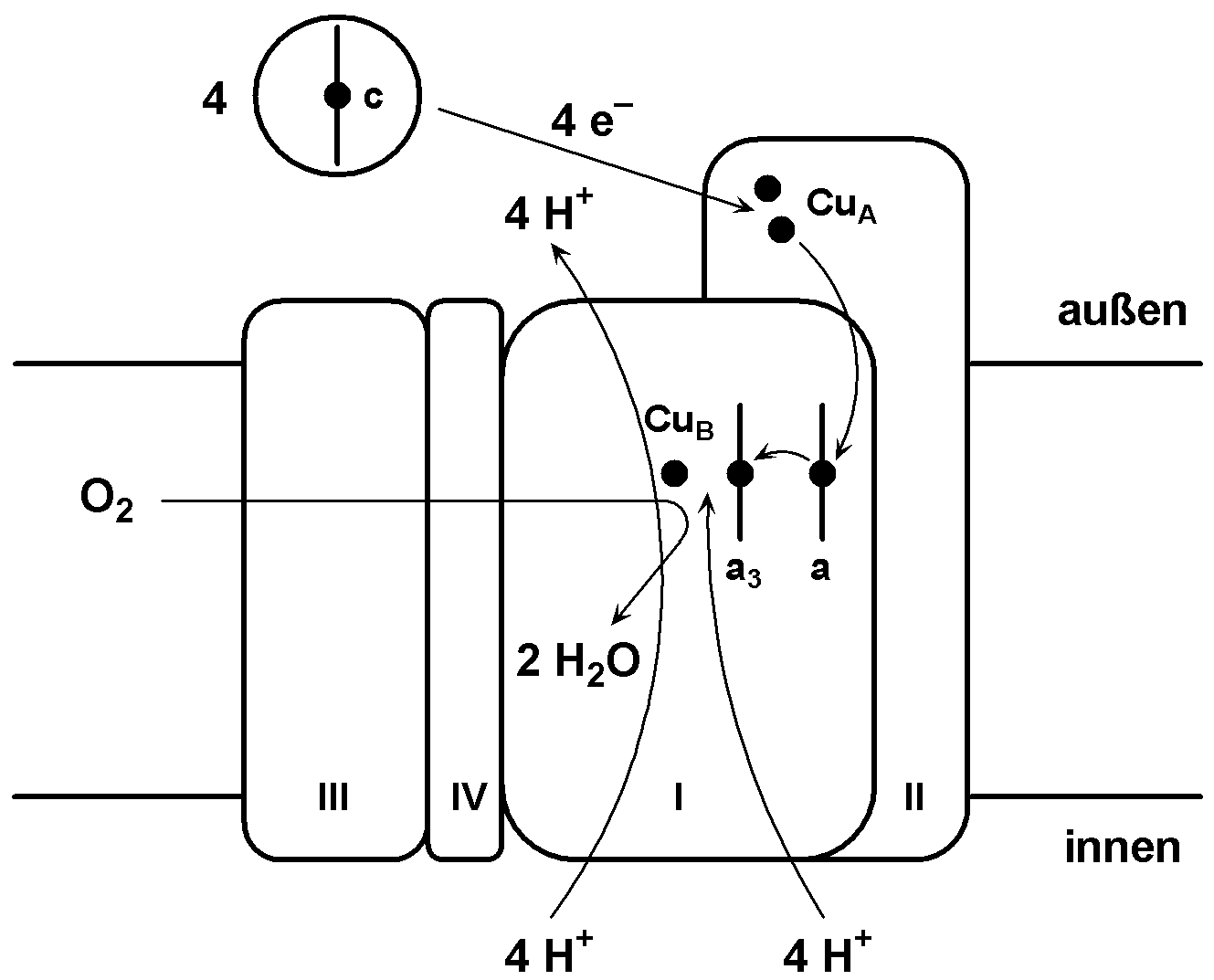
Complex IV

== See also ==
- Cytochrome c oxidase subunit I
- Cytochrome c oxidase subunit II
- Cytochrome c oxidase subunit III
- Heme a
