= COA5 =

Protein-coding gene in humans

Identifiers
- Aliases: COA5, 6330578E17Rik, C2orf64, Pet191, CEMCOX3, cytochrome c oxidase assembly factor 5, MC4DN9
- External IDs: OMIM: 613920; MGI: 1923428; GeneCards: COA5

Gene location (Human)
| Chr. | Chromosome 2 (human) |
| Band | 2q11.2 | Start | 98,599,314 bp |
| Band | 2q11.2 | End | 98,608,515 bp |

Gene location (Mouse)
| Chr. | Chromosome 1 (mouse) |
| Band | 1|1 B | Start | 37,456,165 bp |
| Band | 1|1 B | End | 37,469,184 bp |
RNA expression pattern
| Bgee | Human / Mouse (ortholog); Top expressed in: C1 segment; left ovary; right uterine tube; right ovary; right hemisphere of cerebellum; gastric mucosa; tibial nerve; anterior pituitary; left lobe of thyroid gland; gastrocnemius muscle / Top expressed in: interventricular septum; Paneth cell; vastus lateralis muscle; retinal pigment epithelium; sternocleidomastoid muscle; ciliary body; brown adipose tissue; digastric muscle; myocardium of ventricle; tibialis anterior muscle; More reference expression data |
| BioGPS | n/a |
Gene ontology
| Molecular function | protein binding |
| Cellular component | mitochondrion |
| Biological process | mitochondrial cytochrome c oxidase assembly |
Sources:Amigo / QuickGO
Orthologs
| Databases | NCBI: entry; OMA: entry |
| Species | Human | Mouse |
| Entrez | 493753 | 76178 |
| Ensembl | ENSG00000183513 | ENSMUSG00000026112 |
| UniProt | Q86WW8 | Q99M07 |
| RefSeq (mRNA) | NM_001008215 | NM_198006 |
| RefSeq (protein) | NP_001008216 | NP_932123 |
| Location (UCSC) | Chr 2: 98.6 – 98.61 Mb | Chr 1: 37.46 – 37.47 Mb |
| PubMed search |
- Wikidata
| View/Edit Human | View/Edit Mouse |

Cytochrome c oxidase assembly factor 5 is a protein that in humans is encoded by the COA5 gene. This gene encodes an ortholog of yeast Pet191, which in yeast is a subunit of a large oligomeric complex associated with the mitochondrial inner membrane, and required for the assembly of the cytochrome c oxidase complex. Mutations in this gene are associated with mitochondrial complex IV deficiency.

== Structure ==
The COA5 gene is located on the q arm of chromosome 2 at position 11.2 and it spans 9,195 base pairs. The COA5 gene produces an 8 kDa protein composed of 73 amino acids. The structure of the protein contains the twin CX9C motif of yeast Pet191, which is conserved in the 74-amino acid deduced human protein. An example of the twin CX9C would be a repeated motif of 2 cysteines.

== Function ==
The COA3 gene encodes for a protein involved in an early step of the complex IV assembly process. The conserved cysteines in the twin CX9C motif, which is a part of the COA3 protein, has been shown to be essential in cell viability as well as the proper function and assembly of the cytochrome c oxidase complex.

== Clinical significance ==
Variants of COA5 have been mainly associated with a mitochondrial complex IV deficiency, a deficiency of the enzyme complex Complex IV, which is responsible for the catalysis of oxidation of cytochrome c using molecular oxygen. The deficiency is characterized by heterogeneous phenotypes ranging from isolated myopathy to severe multisystem disease affecting several tissues and organs. Other phenotypes include hypertrophic cardiomyopathy, hepatomegaly and liver dysfunction, hypotonia, muscle weakness, exercise intolerance, developmental delay, delayed motor development and intellectual disability. Mutations in COA5 has also known to be associated with cardioencephalomyopathy, fatal infantile, due to cytochrome c oxidase deficiency 3 (CEMCOX3). CEMCOX3 is an infantile disorder associated with a severely fatal course during the first weeks of life. It is characterized by hypertrophic cardiomyopathy and is caused by mitochondrial complex IV deficiency. Postmortem microscopic investigations have shown accumulation of lipid droplets in cardiomyocytes and mitochondrial proliferation. A homozygous mutation of 157G>C has resulted in decreased complex IV in fibroblasts and heart muscle.

== Interactions ==
COA5 has been known to have unique protein–protein interactions with APP, KRT31, and CHCHD4.
