= COX7A1 =

Protein-coding gene in the species Homo sapiens

Identifiers
- Aliases: COX7A1, COX7A, COX7AH, COX7AM, cytochrome c oxidase subunit 7A1
- External IDs: OMIM: 123995; MGI: 1316714; GeneCards: COX7A1

Gene location (Human)
Chr.	Chromosome 19 (human)
Band	19q13.12	Start	36,150,922 bp
Band	19q13.12	End	36,152,449 bp

Gene location (Mouse)
Chr.	Chromosome 7 (mouse)
Band	7 B1|7 17.31 cM	Start	29,883,569 bp
Band	7 B1|7 17.31 cM	End	29,885,503 bp
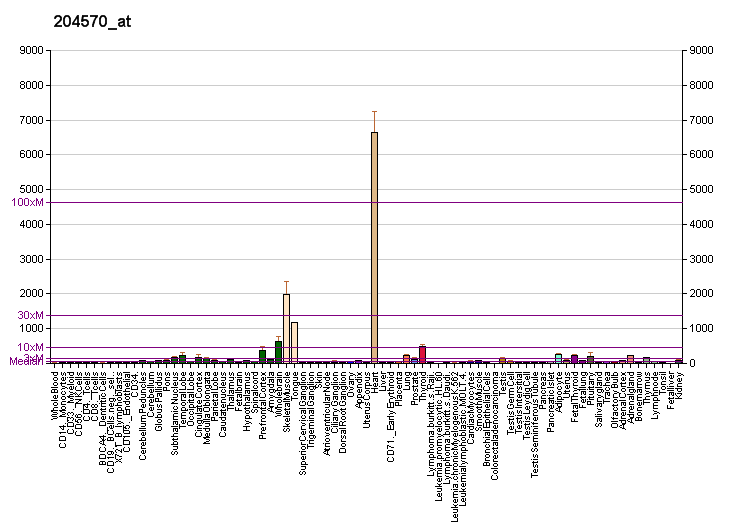
RNA expression pattern
Bgee	Human / Mouse (ortholog); Top expressed in: right ventricle; apex of heart; myocardium of left ventricle; thoracic diaphragm; right auricle of heart; muscle of thigh; biceps brachii; gastrocnemius muscle; Skeletal muscle tissue of biceps brachii; vastus lateralis muscle / Top expressed in: myocardium of ventricle; cardiac muscle tissue of left ventricle; interventricular septum; digastric muscle; intercostal muscle; right ventricle; temporal muscle; muscle of thigh; sternocleidomastoid muscle; thoracic diaphragm; More reference expression data
BioGPS	More reference expression data
Gene ontology
Molecular function	electron transfer activity; cytochrome-c oxidase activity
Cellular component	integral component of membrane; mitochondrial inner membrane; membrane; mitochondrion; mitochondrial respirasome
Biological process	generation of precursor metabolites and energy; proton transmembrane transport; electron transport chain; regulation of oxidative phosphorylation; mitochondrial respirasome assembly
Sources:Amigo / QuickGO
Orthologs
Databases	NCBI: entry; OMA: entry
Species	Human	Mouse
Entrez	1346	12865
Ensembl	ENSG00000161281	ENSMUSG00000074218
UniProt	P24310	P56392
RefSeq (mRNA)	NM_001864	NM_009944
RefSeq (protein)	NP_001855	NP_034074
Location (UCSC)	Chr 19: 36.15 – 36.15 Mb	Chr 7: 29.88 – 29.89 Mb
PubMed search
- Wikidata
View/Edit Human	View/Edit Mouse

Cytochrome c oxidase polypeptide 7A1, mitochondrial is an enzyme that in humans is encoded by the COX7A1 gene.

Cytochrome c oxidase (COX), the terminal component of the mitochondrial respiratory chain, catalyzes the electron transfer from reduced cytochrome c to oxygen. This component is a heteromeric complex consisting of 3 catalytic subunits encoded by mitochondrial genes and multiple structural subunits encoded by nuclear genes. The mitochondrially-encoded subunits function in electron transfer, and the nuclear-encoded subunits may function in the regulation and assembly of the complex. This nuclear gene encodes polypeptide 1 (muscle isoform) of subunit VIIa and the polypeptide 1 is present only in muscle tissues. Other polypeptides of subunit VIIa are present in both muscle and nonmuscle tissues, and are encoded by different genes.
