= COX6B2 =

Protein-coding gene in the species Homo sapiens

Identifiers
- Aliases: COX6B2, COXVIB2, CT59, cytochrome c oxidase subunit 6B2
- External IDs: OMIM: 618127; MGI: 3044182; GeneCards: COX6B2

Gene location (Human)
Chr.	Chromosome 19 (human)
Band	19q13.42	Start	55,349,306 bp
Band	19q13.42	End	55,354,719 bp

Gene location (Mouse)
Chr.	Chromosome 7 (mouse)
Band	7|7 A1	Start	4,754,791 bp
Band	7|7 A1	End	4,756,093 bp
RNA expression pattern
Bgee	Human / Mouse (ortholog); Top expressed in: right testis; left testis; buccal mucosa cell; transverse colon; mucosa of transverse colon; testicle; gonad; olfactory zone of nasal mucosa; rectum; skin of abdomen / Top expressed in: bone marrow; spermatocyte; spermatid; yolk sac; primary oocyte; testicle; secondary oocyte; embryonic cell; urinary bladder; zygote; More reference expression data
BioGPS	n/a
Gene ontology
Molecular function	protein binding
Cellular component	mitochondrial intermembrane space; mitochondrial crista; mitochondrion
Biological process	proton transmembrane transport
Sources:Amigo / QuickGO
Orthologs
Databases	NCBI: entry; OMA: entry
Species	Human	Mouse
Entrez	125965	333182
Ensembl	ENSG00000160471	ENSMUSG00000051811
UniProt	Q6YFQ2	Q80ZN9
RefSeq (mRNA)	NM_144613	NM_001289848; NM_001289849; NM_001289850; NM_183405; NM_183406
RefSeq (protein)	NP_653214; NP_001356727; NP_001356728; NP_001356729	NP_001276777; NP_001276778; NP_001276779; NP_899664; NP_899665
Location (UCSC)	Chr 19: 55.35 – 55.35 Mb	Chr 7: 4.75 – 4.76 Mb
PubMed search
- Wikidata
View/Edit Human	View/Edit Mouse

Cytochrome c oxidase subunit VIb polypeptide 2 is a protein that in humans is encoded by the COX6B2 gene. Cytochrome c oxidase 6B2 is a subunit of the cytochrome c oxidase complex, also known as Complex IV, the last enzyme in the mitochondrial electron transport chain.

== Structure ==
The COX6B2 gene, located on the q arm of chromosome 19 in position 13.42, contains 5 exons and is 5,113 base pairs in length. The protein encoded by the COX6B2 gene weighs 11 kDa and is composed of 88 amino acids. The protein is a subunit of Complex IV, a heteromeric complex consisting of 3 catalytic subunits encoded by mitochondrial genes and multiple structural subunits encoded by nuclear genes.

== Function ==
Cytochrome c oxidase (COX) is the terminal enzyme of the mitochondrial respiratory chain. It is a multi-subunit enzyme complex that couples the transfer of electrons from cytochrome c to molecular oxygen and contributes to a proton electrochemical gradient across the inner mitochondrial membrane to drive ATP synthesis via protonmotive force. The mitochondrially-encoded subunits perform the electron transfer of proton pumping activities. The functions of the nuclear-encoded subunits are unknown but they may play a role in the regulation and assembly of the complex.

Summary reaction:

4 Fe^{2+}-cytochrome c + 8 H^{+}_{in} + O_{2} → 4 Fe^{3+}-cytochrome c + 2 H_{2}O + 4 H^{+}_{out}
