= COX6A2 =

Protein-coding gene in the species Homo sapiens

Identifiers
- Aliases: COX6A2, COX6AH, COXVIAH, cytochrome c oxidase subunit 6A2, MC4DN18, COXVIa-M
- External IDs: OMIM: 602009; MGI: 104649; GeneCards: COX6A2

Gene location (Human)
Chr.	Chromosome 16 (human)
Band	16p11.2	Start	31,427,731 bp
Band	16p11.2	End	31,428,360 bp

Gene location (Mouse)
Chr.	Chromosome 7 (mouse)
Band	7 F3|7 70.04 cM	Start	127,804,607 bp
Band	7 F3|7 70.04 cM	End	127,805,559 bp
RNA expression pattern
Bgee	Human / Mouse (ortholog); Top expressed in: muscle of thigh; apex of heart; gastrocnemius muscle; right auricle of heart; triceps brachii muscle; left ventricle; glutes; thoracic diaphragm; biceps brachii; Skeletal muscle tissue of biceps brachii / Top expressed in: digastric muscle; right ventricle; interventricular septum; sternocleidomastoid muscle; plantaris muscle; muscle of thigh; extensor digitorum longus muscle; soleus muscle; temporal muscle; triceps brachii muscle; More reference expression data
BioGPS	n/a
Gene ontology
Molecular function	cytochrome-c oxidase activity; enzyme regulator activity
Cellular component	membrane; mitochondrion; mitochondrial inner membrane; mitochondrial respiratory chain complex IV
Biological process	proton transmembrane transport; generation of precursor metabolites and energy; mitochondrial electron transport, cytochrome c to oxygen; aerobic dissimilation; regulation of catalytic activity
Sources:Amigo / QuickGO
Orthologs
Databases	NCBI: entry; OMA: entry
Species	Human	Mouse
Entrez	1339	12862
Ensembl	ENSG00000156885	ENSMUSG00000030785
UniProt	Q02221	P43023
RefSeq (mRNA)	NM_005205	NM_009943
RefSeq (protein)	NP_005196	NP_034073
Location (UCSC)	Chr 16: 31.43 – 31.43 Mb	Chr 7: 127.8 – 127.81 Mb
PubMed search
- Wikidata
View/Edit Human	View/Edit Mouse

Cytochrome c oxidase subunit VIa polypeptide 2 is a protein that in humans is encoded by the COX6A2 gene. Cytochrome c oxidase 6A2 is a subunit of the cytochrome c oxidase complex, also known as Complex IV, the last enzyme in the mitochondrial electron transport chain.

== Structure ==
The COX6A2 gene, located on the p arm of chromosome 16 in position 11.12, contains 3 exons and is 698 base pairs in length. The COX6A1 protein weighs 11 kDa and is composed of 97 amino acids. The protein is a subunit of Complex IV, a heteromeric complex consisting of 3 catalytic subunits encoded by mitochondrial genes and multiple structural subunits encoded by nuclear genes. This nuclear gene encodes polypeptide 2 (heart/muscle isoform) of subunit VIa, and polypeptide 2 is present only in striated muscles. Polypeptide 1 (liver isoform) of subunit VIa is encoded by a different gene, COX6A1, and is found in all non-muscle tissues. These two polypeptides share 66% amino acid sequence identity.

== Function ==
Cytochrome c oxidase (COX) is the terminal enzyme of the mitochondrial respiratory chain. It is a multi-subunit enzyme complex that couples the transfer of electrons from cytochrome c to molecular oxygen and contributes to a proton electrochemical gradient across the inner mitochondrial membrane to drive ATP synthesis via protonmotive force. The mitochondrially-encoded subunits perform the electron transfer of proton pumping activities. The functions of the nuclear-encoded subunits are unknown but they may play a role in the regulation and assembly of the complex.

Summary reaction:

4 Fe^{2+}-cytochrome c + 8 H^{+}_{in} + O_{2} → 4 Fe^{3+}-cytochrome c + 2 H_{2}O + 4 H^{+}_{out}

== Clinical significance ==
The Trans-activator of transcription protein (Tat) of human immunodeficiency virus (HIV) inhibits cytochrome c oxidase (COX) activity in permeabilized mitochondria isolated from both mouse and human liver, heart, and brain samples. Rapid loss of membrane potential (ΔΨ_{m}) occurs with submicromolar doses of Tat, and cytochrome c is released from the mitochondria.
