= COX7A2 =

Protein-coding gene in the species Homo sapiens

Identifiers
- Aliases: COX7A2, COX7AL, COX7AL1, COXVIIAL, COXVIIa-L, VIIAL, cytochrome c oxidase subunit 7A2
- External IDs: OMIM: 123996; MGI: 1316715; GeneCards: COX7A2

Gene location (Human)
Chr.	Chromosome 6 (human)
Band	6q14.1	Start	75,237,675 bp
Band	6q14.1	End	75,250,323 bp

Gene location (Mouse)
Chr.	Chromosome 9 (mouse)
Band	9 E1|9 43.82 cM	Start	79,662,643 bp
Band	9 E1|9 43.82 cM	End	79,667,160 bp
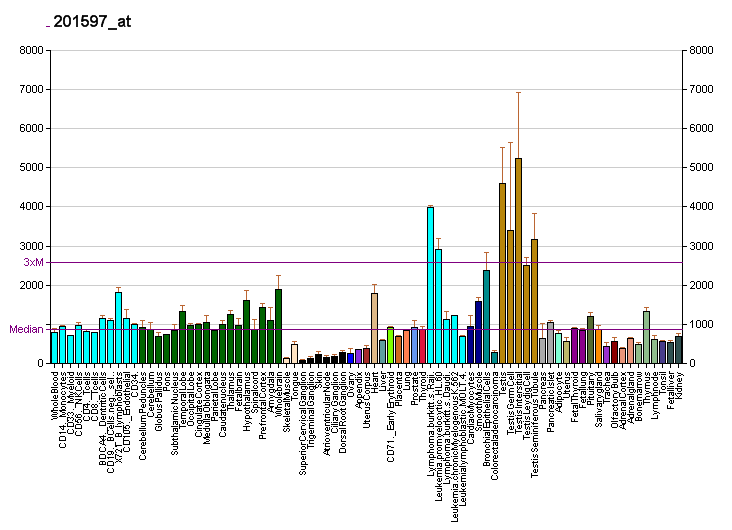
RNA expression pattern
Bgee	Human / Mouse (ortholog); Top expressed in: endothelial cell; left testis; right testis; pancreatic ductal cell; right ventricle; Brodmann area 23; sperm; apex of heart; primary visual cortex; lateral nuclear group of thalamus / Top expressed in: facial motor nucleus; medial ganglionic eminence; digastric muscle; otic placode; temporal muscle; sternocleidomastoid muscle; epithelium of stomach; triceps brachii muscle; intercostal muscle; medial vestibular nucleus; More reference expression data
BioGPS	More reference expression data
Gene ontology
Molecular function	electron transfer activity; cytochrome-c oxidase activity
Cellular component	mitochondrial inner membrane; membrane; mitochondrion; mitochondrial respirasome
Biological process	proton transmembrane transport; electron transport chain; regulation of oxidative phosphorylation; mitochondrial respirasome assembly
Sources:Amigo / QuickGO
Orthologs
Databases	NCBI: entry; OMA: entry
Species	Human	Mouse
Entrez	1347	12866
Ensembl	ENSG00000112695	ENSMUSG00000032330
UniProt	P14406	P48771
RefSeq (mRNA)	NM_001865	NM_009945
RefSeq (protein)	NP_001856; NP_001353221; NP_001353222	NP_034075
Location (UCSC)	Chr 6: 75.24 – 75.25 Mb	Chr 9: 79.66 – 79.67 Mb
PubMed search
- Wikidata
View/Edit Human	View/Edit Mouse

Cytochrome c oxidase polypeptide 7A2, mitochondrial is an enzyme that in humans is encoded by the COX7A2 gene.

Cytochrome c oxidase (COX), the terminal component of the mitochondrial respiratory chain, catalyzes the electron transfer from reduced cytochrome c to oxygen.

This component is a heteromeric complex consisting of 3 catalytic subunits encoded by mitochondrial genes and multiple structural subunits encoded by nuclear genes. The mitochondrially encoded subunits function in electron transfer, and the nuclear-encoded subunits may function in the regulation and assembly of the complex. This nuclear gene encodes polypeptide 2 (liver isoform) of subunit VIIa and the polypeptide 2 is present in both muscle and nonmuscle tissues.

In addition to polypeptide 2, subunit VIIa includes polypeptide 1 (muscle isoform), which is present only in muscle tissues, and a related protein, present in all tissues. This gene may have several pseudogenes.
