= MAGEA4 =

Protein-coding gene in humans

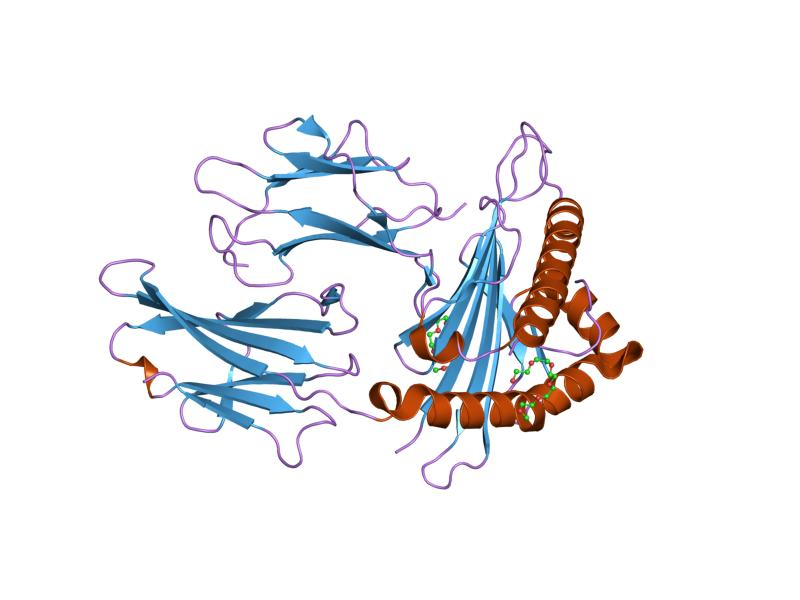

Identifiers
- Aliases: MAGEA4, CT1.4, MAGE-41, MAGE-X2, MAGE4, MAGE4A, MAGE4B, MAGE family member A4
- External IDs: OMIM: 300175; GeneCards: MAGEA4
Available structures
| PDB | Human UniProt search: PDBe RCSB |
| PDB | List of PDB id codes 1I4F, 2WA0 |

Gene location (Human)
| Chr. | X chromosome (human) |
| Band | Xq28 | Start | 151,912,509 bp |
| Band | Xq28 | End | 151,925,170 bp |
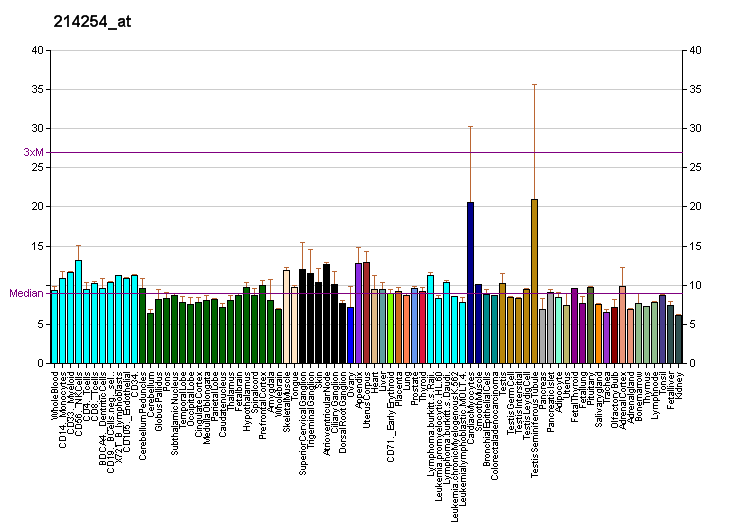
RNA expression pattern
| Bgee | Human / Mouse (ortholog); Top expressed in: testicle; right testis; left testis; gonad; placenta; renal cortex; lymph node; human musculoskeletal system; endometrium; muscular system / n/a; More reference expression data |
| BioGPS | More reference expression data |
Gene ontology
| Molecular function | protein binding; molecular function |
| Cellular component | cellular component |
| Biological process | biological process |
Sources:Amigo / QuickGO
Orthologs
| Databases | NCBI: entry; OMA: entry |
| Species | Human | Mouse |
| Entrez | 4103 | n/a |
| Ensembl | ENSG00000147381 | n/a |
| UniProt | P43358 | n/a |
| RefSeq (mRNA) | NM_001011548; NM_001011549; NM_001011550; NM_002362 | n/a |
| RefSeq (protein) | NP_001011548; NP_001011549; NP_001011550; NP_002353 | n/a |
| Location (UCSC) | Chr X: 151.91 – 151.93 Mb | n/a |
| PubMed search | | n/a |
- Wikidata
| View/Edit Human |

Melanoma-associated antigen 4 is a protein that in humans is encoded by the MAGEA4 gene.

This gene is a member of the MAGEA gene family. The members of this family encode proteins with 50 to 80% sequence identity to each other. The promoters and first exons of the MAGEA genes show considerable variability, suggesting that the existence of this gene family enables the same function to be expressed under different transcriptional controls.

== Clinical importance ==
The MAGEA genes are clustered at chromosomal location Xq28. They have been implicated in some hereditary disorders, such as dyskeratosis congenita. At least four variants encoding the same protein have been found for this gene.

In salivary gland carcinomas, MAGE4 expression correlates to lower-grade histology, lower likelihood of metastases and more favourable survival.

While MAGEA4 is expressed by many tumours, it is almost universally expressed by synovial sarcomas. A targeted treatment to use genetically modified autologous T cells is (as of June 2021) undergoing clinical trials.
