= COX7C =

Protein-coding gene in the species Homo sapiens

Identifiers
- Aliases: COX7C, cytochrome c oxidase subunit 7C
- External IDs: OMIM: 603774; MGI: 103226; GeneCards: COX7C

Gene location (Human)
| Chr. | Chromosome 5 (human) |
| Band | 5q14.3 | Start | 86,617,928 bp |
| Band | 5q14.3 | End | 86,620,962 bp |

Gene location (Mouse)
| Chr. | Chromosome 13 (mouse) |
| Band | 13|13 C3 | Start | 86,192,935 bp |
| Band | 13|13 C3 | End | 86,195,023 bp |
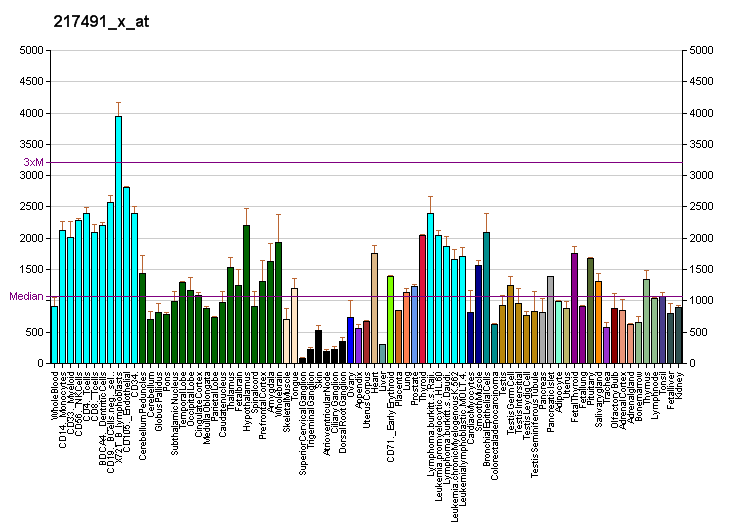

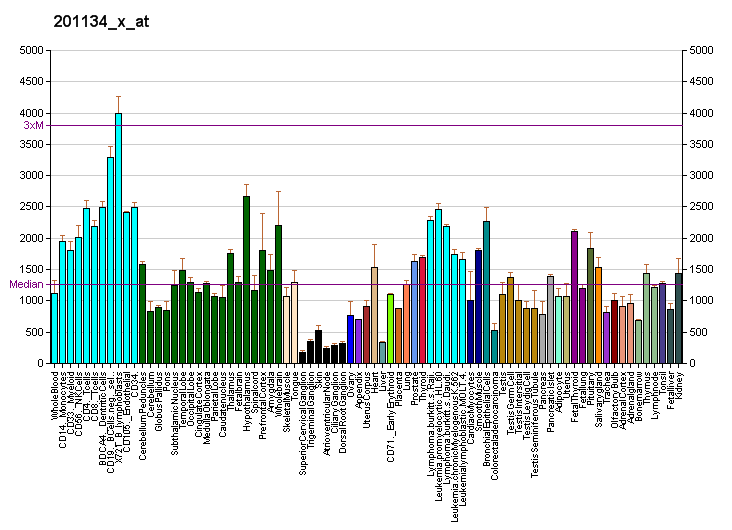
RNA expression pattern
| Bgee | Human / Mouse (ortholog); Top expressed in: right ventricle; right auricle of heart; left ventricle; apex of heart; muscle of thigh; human kidney; prefrontal cortex; ganglionic eminence; biceps brachii; mucosa of transverse colon / Top expressed in: quadriceps femoris muscle; right kidney; yolk sac; heart; proximal tubule; stomach; muscle tissue; neural tube; skeletal muscle tissue; jejunum; More reference expression data |
| BioGPS | More reference expression data |
Gene ontology
| Molecular function | cytochrome-c oxidase activity |
| Cellular component | integral component of membrane; mitochondrial inner membrane; membrane; mitochondrion; mitochondrial respiratory chain complex IV |
| Biological process | proton transmembrane transport; generation of precursor metabolites and energy; mitochondrial electron transport, cytochrome c to oxygen |
Sources:Amigo / QuickGO
Orthologs
| Databases | NCBI: entry; OMA: entry |
| Species | Human | Mouse |
| Entrez | 1350 | 12867 |
| Ensembl | ENSG00000127184 | ENSMUSG00000017778 |
| UniProt | P15954 | P17665 |
| RefSeq (mRNA) | NM_001867 | NM_007749 |
| RefSeq (protein) | NP_001858 | NP_031775 |
| Location (UCSC) | Chr 5: 86.62 – 86.62 Mb | Chr 13: 86.19 – 86.2 Mb |
| PubMed search |
- Wikidata
| View/Edit Human | View/Edit Mouse |

Cytochrome c oxidase subunit 7C, mitochondrial is an enzyme that in humans is encoded by the COX7C gene.

Cytochrome c oxidase (COX), the terminal component of the mitochondrial respiratory chain, catalyzes the electron transfer from reduced cytochrome c to oxygen. This component is a heteromeric complex consisting of 3 catalytic subunits encoded by mitochondrial genes and multiple structural subunits encoded by nuclear genes. The mitochondrially-encoded subunits function in electron transfer, and the nuclear-encoded subunits may function in the regulation and assembly of the complex. This nuclear gene encodes subunit VIIc, which shares 87% and 85% amino acid sequence identity with mouse and bovine COX VIIc, respectively, and is found in all tissues. A pseudogene COX7CP1 has been found on chromosome 13.
