= ENKD1 =

Protein-coding gene in the species Homo sapiens

Identifiers
- Aliases: ENKD1, C16orf48, DAKV6410, enkurin domain containing 1, FBB11
- External IDs: MGI: 2142593; HomoloGene: 12957; GeneCards: ENKD1; OMA:ENKD1 - orthologs

Gene location (Human)
| Chr. | Chromosome 16 (human) |
| Band | 16q22.1 | Start | 67,662,945 bp |
| Band | 16q22.1 | End | 67,667,265 bp |

Gene location (Mouse)
| Chr. | Chromosome 8 (mouse) |
| Band | 8|8 D3 | Start | 106,430,283 bp |
| Band | 8|8 D3 | End | 106,434,842 bp |
RNA expression pattern
| Bgee | Human / Mouse (ortholog); Top expressed in: body of pancreas; right uterine tube; right hemisphere of cerebellum; right testis; left testis; anterior pituitary; right lobe of thyroid gland; olfactory zone of nasal mucosa; muscle layer of sigmoid colon; left lobe of thyroid gland / Top expressed in: spermatocyte; spermatid; seminiferous tubule; neural layer of retina; embryo; epiblast; ventricular zone; embryo; yolk sac; thymus; More reference expression data |
| BioGPS | n/a |
Orthologs
| Species | Human | Mouse |
| Entrez | 84080 | 102124 |
| Ensembl | ENSG00000124074 | ENSMUSG00000013155 |
| UniProt | Q9H0I2 | Q7TSV9 |
| RefSeq (mRNA) | NM_032140 | NM_198299 |
| RefSeq (protein) | NP_115516 | NP_938041 |
| Location (UCSC) | Chr 16: 67.66 – 67.67 Mb | Chr 8: 106.43 – 106.43 Mb |
| PubMed search |
- Wikidata
| View/Edit Human | View/Edit Mouse |

Enkurin domain-containing protein 1 is a protein that in humans is encoded by the ENKD1 gene.
