= COX17 =

Protein-coding gene in the species Homo sapiens

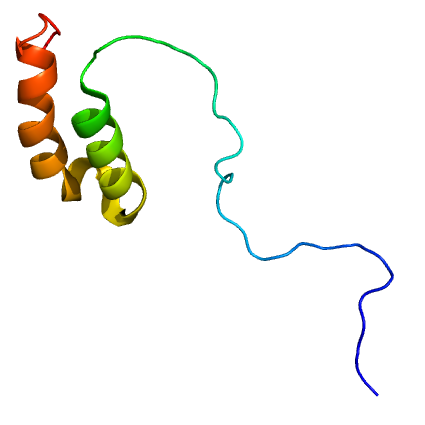
Available structures
| PDB | Ortholog search: PDBe RCSB |
| PDB | List of PDB id codes 2L0Y, 2LGQ, 2RN9, 2RNB |

Identifiers
- Aliases: COX17, cytochrome c oxidase copper chaperone, cytochrome c oxidase copper chaperone COX17
- External IDs: OMIM: 604813; MGI: 1333806; HomoloGene: 38089; GeneCards: COX17; OMA:COX17 - orthologs

Gene location (Human)
| Chr. | Chromosome 3 (human) |
| Band | 3q13.33 | Start | 119,654,513 bp |
| Band | 3q13.33 | End | 119,677,454 bp |

Gene location (Mouse)
| Chr. | Chromosome 16 (mouse) |
| Band | 16|16 B3 | Start | 38,167,353 bp |
| Band | 16|16 B3 | End | 38,173,125 bp |
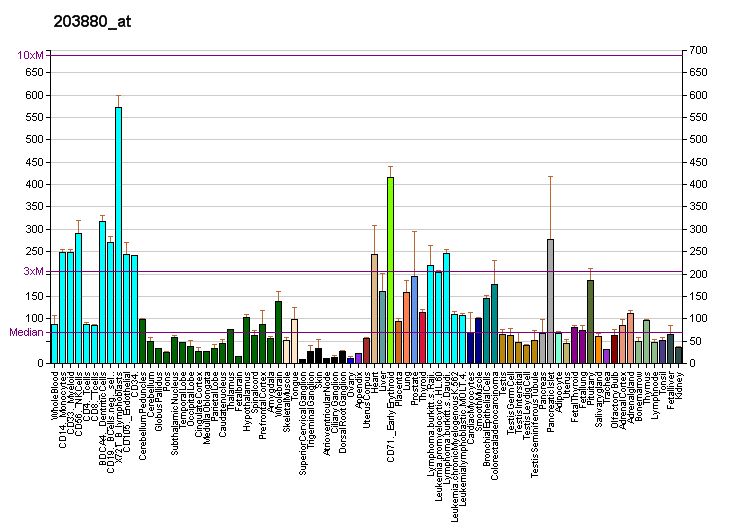
RNA expression pattern
| Bgee | Human / Mouse (ortholog); Top expressed in: pituitary gland; anterior pituitary; left ventricle; apex of heart; right auricle of heart; left adrenal cortex; right adrenal gland; gastrocnemius muscle; right adrenal cortex; skeletal muscle tissue / Top expressed in: yolk sac; aortic valve; ascending aorta; facial motor nucleus; seminal vesicula; supraoptic nucleus; Ileal epithelium; epithelium of stomach; intercostal muscle; atrioventricular valve; More reference expression data |
| BioGPS | More reference expression data |
Gene ontology
| Molecular function | copper ion binding; protein binding; metal ion binding; cuprous ion binding; copper chaperone activity |
| Cellular component | mitochondrion; mitochondrial intermembrane space; cytoplasm |
| Biological process | heart development; brain development; generation of precursor metabolites and energy; copper ion transport; positive regulation of cell population proliferation; mitochondrial cytochrome c oxidase assembly; positive regulation of cytochrome-c oxidase activity |
Sources:Amigo / QuickGO
Orthologs
| Species | Human | Mouse |
| Entrez | 10063 | 12856 |
| Ensembl | ENSG00000138495 | ENSMUSG00000046516 |
| UniProt | Q14061 | P56394 |
| RefSeq (mRNA) | NM_005694 | NM_001017429 |
| RefSeq (protein) | NP_005685; NP_001368931; NP_001368932 | NP_001017429 |
| Location (UCSC) | Chr 3: 119.65 – 119.68 Mb | Chr 16: 38.17 – 38.17 Mb |
| PubMed search |
- Wikidata
| View/Edit Human | View/Edit Mouse |

Cytochrome c oxidase copper chaperone is a protein that in humans is encoded by the COX17 gene.

== Function ==
Cytochrome c oxidase (COX), the terminal component of the mitochondrial respiratory chain, catalyzes the electron transfer from reduced cytochrome c to oxygen. This component is a heteromeric complex consisting of 3 catalytic subunits encoded by mitochondrial genes and multiple structural subunits encoded by nuclear genes. The mitochondrially-encoded subunits function in electron transfer, and the nuclear-encoded subunits may function in the regulation and assembly of the complex. This nuclear gene encodes a protein which is not a structural subunit, but may be involved in the recruitment of copper to mitochondria for incorporation into the COX apoenzyme. This protein shares 92% amino acid sequence identity with mouse and rat Cox17 proteins. This gene is no longer considered to be a candidate gene for COX deficiency. A pseudogene COX17P has been found on chromosome 13.
