= COX6C =

Protein-coding gene in the species Homo sapiens

Identifiers
- Aliases: COX6C, cytochrome c oxidase subunit 6C
- External IDs: OMIM: 124090; GeneCards: COX6C

Gene location (Human)
Chr.	Chromosome 8 (human)
Band	8q22.2	Start	99,873,200 bp
Band	8q22.2	End	99,893,707 bp
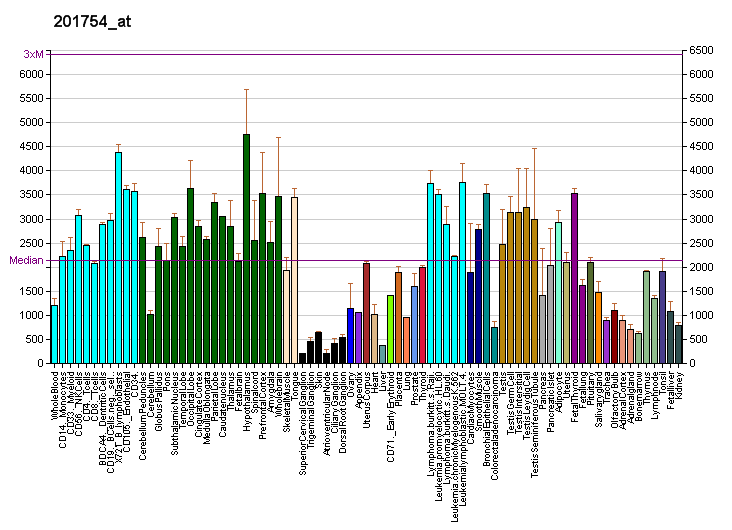
RNA expression pattern
Bgee	Human / Mouse (ortholog); Top expressed in: pons; ventricle of the heart; left ventricle; body of tongue; right ventricle; superior vestibular nucleus; Skeletal muscle tissue of rectus abdominis; apex of heart; biceps brachii; right auricle of heart / n/a; More reference expression data
BioGPS	More reference expression data
Gene ontology
Molecular function	cytochrome-c oxidase activity
Cellular component	integral component of membrane; mitochondrial inner membrane; membrane; mitochondrion
Biological process	proton transmembrane transport; generation of precursor metabolites and energy; electron transport chain; mitochondrial electron transport, cytochrome c to oxygen
Sources:Amigo / QuickGO
Orthologs
Databases	NCBI: entry; OMA: entry
Species	Human	Mouse
Entrez	1345	102640946
Ensembl	ENSG00000164919	n/a
UniProt	P09669	n/a
RefSeq (mRNA)	NM_004374	n/a
RefSeq (protein)	NP_004365	n/a
Location (UCSC)	Chr 8: 99.87 – 99.89 Mb	n/a
PubMed search
- Wikidata
View/Edit Human	View/Edit Mouse

Cytochrome c oxidase subunit 6C is an enzyme that in humans is encoded by the COX6C gene.

Cytochrome c oxidase (COX), the terminal enzyme of the mitochondrial respiratory chain, catalyzes the electron transfer from reduced cytochrome c to oxygen. It is a heteromeric complex consisting of 3 catalytic subunits encoded by mitochondrial genes and multiple structural subunits encoded by nuclear genes. The mitochondrially-encoded subunits function in electron transfer, and the nuclear-encoded subunits may be involved in the regulation and assembly of the complex. This nuclear gene encodes subunit VIc, which has 77% amino acid sequence identity with mouse COX subunit VIc. This gene is up-regulated in prostate cancer cells. A pseudogene COX6CP1 has been found on chromosomes 16p12.
