= Cytochrome c oxidase subunit I =

Enzyme of the respiratory chain encoded by the mitochondrial genome

COX1

Identifiers
- Aliases: COX1, mitochondrially encoded cytochrome c oxidase I, COI, MTCO1, Main subunit of cytochrome c oxidase, CO I, cytochrome c oxidase subunit I
- External IDs: OMIM: 516030; MGI: 102504; GeneCards: COX1
Enzyme activity
EC #	BRENDA	ExPASy	KEGG	MetaCyc
7.1.1.9	↗	↗	↗	↗
Gene location (Human)
Chr.	Mitochondrial DNA (human)
Band	n/a	Start	5,904 bp
Band	n/a	End	7,445 bp
Gene location (Mouse)
Chr.	Mitochondrial DNA (mouse)
Band	n/a	Start	5,328 bp
Band	n/a	End	6,872 bp
RNA expression pattern
Bgee	Human / Mouse (ortholog); Top expressed in: right uterine tube; apex of heart; duodenum; stromal cell of endometrium; right coronary artery; rectum; Brodmann area 9; smooth muscle tissue; gallbladder; appendix / Top expressed in: dentate gyrus of hippocampal formation granule cell; cerebellar cortex; esophagus; primary visual cortex; Cortex of frontal lobe; superior frontal gyrus; hippocampus proper; muscle of thigh; jejunum; ganglionic eminence; More reference expression data
BioGPS	n/a
Gene ontology
Molecular function	cytochrome-c oxidase activity; metal ion binding; protein binding; heme binding; oxidoreductase activity
Cellular component	integral component of membrane; membrane; mitochondrion; mitochondrial inner membrane; respirasome; respiratory chain complex IV; mitochondrial respiratory chain complex III; mitochondrial respiratory chain complex IV
Biological process	response to copper ion; ageing; response to electrical stimulus; response to oxidative stress; cerebellum development; oxidative phosphorylation; mitochondrial electron transport, cytochrome c to oxygen; aerobic dissimilation; electron transport coupled proton transport
Sources:Amigo / QuickGO
Orthologs
Databases	NCBI: entry; OMA: entry
Species	Human	Mouse
Entrez	4512	17708
Ensembl	ENSG00000198804	ENSMUSG00000064351
UniProt	P00395	P00397
RefSeq (mRNA)	n/a	n/a
RefSeq (protein)	n/a	NP_904330
Location (UCSC)	Chr M: 0.01 – 0.01 Mb	Chr M: 0.01 – 0.01 Mb
PubMed search
- Wikidata
View/Edit Human	View/Edit Mouse

Cytochrome c oxidase subunit I
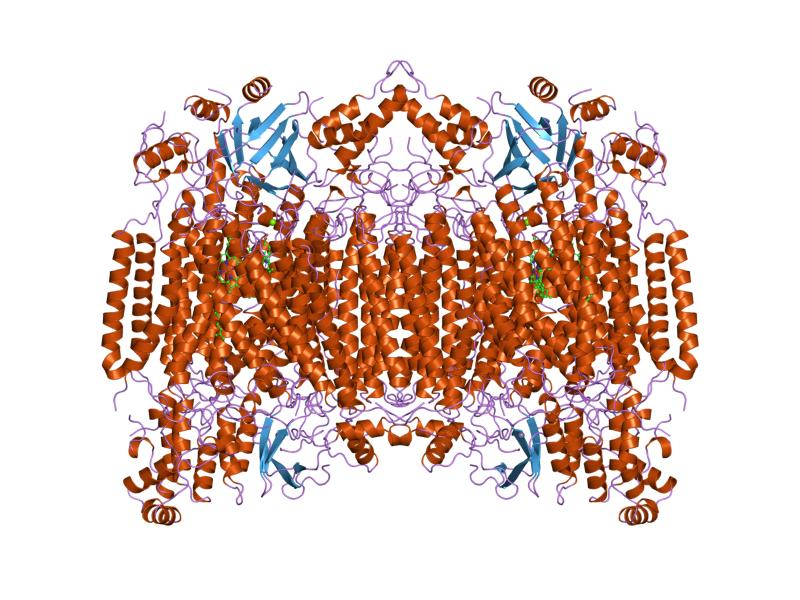
- Structure of the 13-subunit oxidized cytochrome c oxidase.

Identifiers
- Symbol: COX1 or COI
- Pfam: PF00115
- InterPro: IPR000883
- PROSITE: PDOC00074
- SCOP2: 1occ / SCOPe / SUPFAM
- TCDB: 3.D.4
- OPM superfamily: 4
- OPM protein: 1v55
- CDD: cd01663
Available protein structures:
- PDB: IPR000883 PF00115 (ECOD; PDBsum)
- AlphaFold: IPR000883; PF00115

Location of the MT-CO1 gene in the human mitochondrial genome. MT-CO1 is one of the three cytochrome c oxidase subunit mitochondrial genes (orange boxes).

Cytochrome c oxidase I (COX1) also known as mitochondrially encoded cytochrome c oxidase I (MT-CO1) is a protein that is encoded by the MT-CO1 gene in eukaryotes. The gene is also called COX1, CO1, or COI. Cytochrome c oxidase I is the main subunit of the cytochrome c oxidase complex. In humans, mutations in MT-CO1 have been associated with Leber's hereditary optic neuropathy (LHON), acquired idiopathic sideroblastic anemia, Complex IV deficiency, colorectal cancer, sensorineural deafness, and recurrent myoglobinuria.

== Structure ==
In humans, the MT-CO1 gene is located from nucleotide pairs 5904 to 7444 on the guanine-rich heavy (H) section of mtDNA. The gene product is a 57 kDa protein composed of 513 amino acids.

== Function ==
Cytochrome c oxidase subunit I (CO1 or MT-CO1) is one of three mitochondrial DNA (mtDNA) encoded subunits (MT-CO1, MT-CO2, MT-CO3) of cytochrome c oxidase, also known as complex IV. Cytochrome c oxidase (EC 1.9.3.1) is a key enzyme in aerobic metabolism. It is the third and final enzyme of the electron transport chain of mitochondrial oxidative phosphorylation.

Proton pumping heme-copper oxidases represent the terminal, energy-transfer enzymes of respiratory chains in prokaryotes and eukaryotes. The CuB-heme a3 (or heme o) binuclear centre, associated with the largest subunit I of cytochrome c and ubiquinol oxidases (EC 1.10.3.10), is directly involved in the coupling between dioxygen reduction and proton pumping. Some terminal oxidases generate a transmembrane proton gradient across the plasma membrane (prokaryotes) or the mitochondrial inner membrane (eukaryotes).

The enzyme complex consists of 3-4 subunits (prokaryotes) up to 13 polypeptides (mammals) of which only the catalytic subunit (equivalent to mammalian subunit I (COI)) is found in all heme-copper respiratory oxidases. The presence of a bimetallic centre (formed by a high-spin heme and copper B) as well as a low-spin heme, both ligated to six conserved histidine residues near the outer side of four transmembrane spans within COI is common to all family members. In contrast to eukaryotes the respiratory chain of prokaryotes is branched to multiple terminal oxidases. The enzyme complexes vary in heme and copper composition, substrate type and substrate affinity. The different respiratory oxidases allow the cells to customize their respiratory systems according to a variety of environmental growth conditions.

It has been shown that eubacterial quinol oxidase was derived from cytochrome c oxidase in Gram-positive bacteria and that archaebacterial quinol oxidase has an independent origin. A considerable amount of evidence suggests that Pseudomonadota (also known as proteobacteria or purple bacteria) acquired quinol oxidase through a lateral gene transfer from Gram-positive bacteria.

A related nitric-oxide reductase (EC 1.7.99.7) exists in denitrifying species of archaea and eubacteria and is a heterodimer of cytochromes b and c. Phenazine methosulphate can act as acceptor. It has been suggested that cytochrome c oxidase catalytic subunits evolved from ancient nitric oxide reductases that could reduce both nitrogen and oxygen.

== Clinical significance ==
Mutations in this gene in humans are associated with Leber's hereditary optic neuropathy (LHON), acquired idiopathic sideroblastic anemia, Complex IV deficiency, colorectal cancer, sensorineural deafness, and recurrent myoglobinuria.

=== Leber's hereditary optic neuropathy (LHON) ===
LHON, correlated with mutations in MT-CO1, is characterized by optic nerve dysfunction, causing subacute or acute central vision loss. Some patients may display neurological or cardiac conduction defects. Because this disease is a result of mitochondrial DNA mutations affecting the respiratory chain complexes, it is inherited maternally.

=== Acquired Idiopathic Sideroblastic Anemia ===
MT-CO1 may be involved in the development of acquired idiopathic sideroblastic anemia. Mutations in mitochondrial DNA can cause respiratory chain dysfunction, preventing reduction of ferric iron to ferrous iron, which is required for the final step in mitochondrial biosynthesis of heme. The result is a ferric accumulation in mitochondria and insufficient heme production.

=== Mitochondrial Complex IV deficiency (MT-C4D) ===
Mutations in this gene can cause mitochondrial Complex IV deficiency, a disease of the mitochondrial respiratory chain displaying a wide variety of clinical manifestations ranging from isolated myopathy to a severe multisystem disease affecting multiple organs and tissues. Symptoms may include liver dysfunction and hepatomegaly, hypotonia, muscle weakness, exercise intolerance, delayed motor development, mental retardation, developmental delay, and hypertrophic cardiomyopathy. In some patients, the hypertrophic cardiomyopathy is fatal at the neonatal stage. Other affected individuals may manifest Leigh disease.

=== Colorectal cancer (CRC) ===
MT-CO1 mutations play a role in colorectal cancer, a very complex disease displaying malignant lesions in the inner walls of the colon and rectum. Numerous such genetic alterations are often involved with the progression of adenoma, or premalignant lesions, to invasive adenocarcinoma. Long-standing ulcerative colitis, colon polyps, and family history are risk factors for colorectal cancer.

=== Recurrent myoglobinuria mitochondrial (RM-MT) ===
RM-MT is a disease that is characterized by recurrent attacks of rhabdomyolysis (necrosis or disintegration of skeletal muscle) associated with muscle pain and weakness, exercise intolerance, low muscle capacity for oxidative phosphorylation, and followed by excretion of myoglobin in the urine. It has been associated with mitochondrial myopathy. A G5920A mutation, and a heteroplasmic G6708A nonsense mutation have been associated with COX deficiency and RM-MT.

=== Deafness, sensorineural, mitochondrial (DFNM) ===
DFNM is a form of non-syndromic deafness with maternal inheritance. Affected individuals manifest progressive, postlingual, sensorineural hearing loss involving high frequencies. The mutation, A1555G, has been associated with this disease.

== Subfamilies ==
- Cytochrome c oxidase cbb3-type, subunit I InterPro: IPR004677
- Cytochrome o ubiquinol oxidase, subunit I InterPro: IPR014207
- Cytochrome aa3 quinol oxidase, subunit I InterPro: IPR014233
- Cytochrome c oxidase, subunit I bacterial type InterPro: IPR014241

== Use in DNA barcoding ==
MT-CO1 is a gene that is often used as a DNA barcode to identify animal species. The MT-CO1 gene sequence is suitable for this role because its mutation rate is generally fast enough to distinguish closely related species and also because its sequence is conserved among conspecifics. Contrary to the primary objection raised by skeptics that MT-CO1 sequence differences are too small to be detected between closely related species, more than 2% sequence divergence is typically detected between closely related animal species, suggesting that the barcode is effective for most animals. In most if not all seed plants, however, the rate of evolution of MT-CO1 is very slow. It has also been suggested that MT-CO1 may be a better gene for DNA barcoding of soil fungi than ITS (the genetic region most commonly used for mycological barcoding).

== MT-COI (= CCOI) in colonic crypts ==
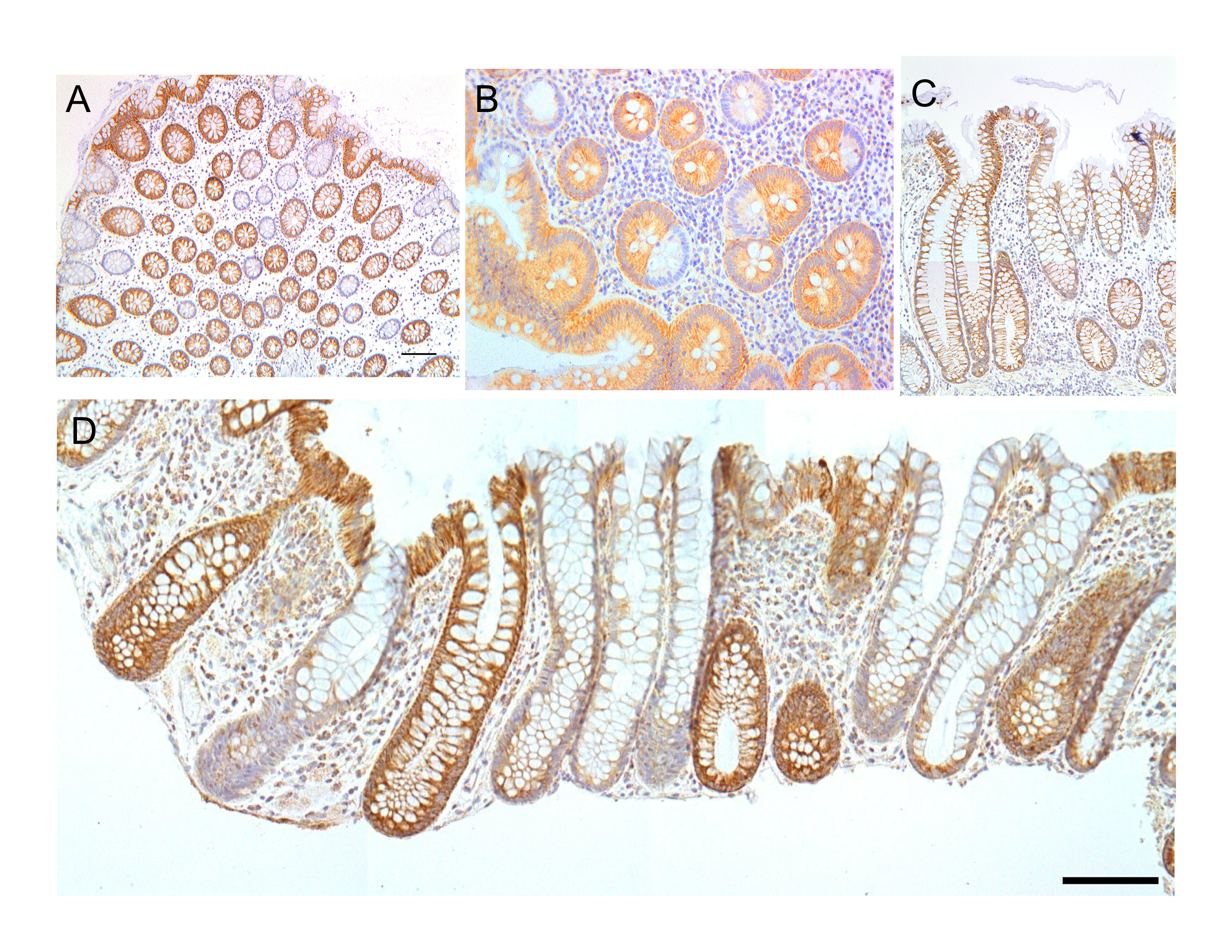
Colonic crypts (intestinal glands) within four tissue sections. The cells have been stained by immunohistochemistry to show a brown-orange color if the cells produce the mitochondrial protein cytochrome c oxidase subunit I (CCOI, synonym for MT-COI), and the nuclei of the cells (located at the outer edges of the cells lining the walls of the crypts) are stained blue-gray with haematoxylin. Panels A, B were cut across the long axes of the crypts and panels C, D were cut parallel to the long axes of the crypts. In panel A the bar shows 100 μm and allows an estimate of the frequency of crypts in the colonic epithelium. Panel B includes three crypts in cross-section, each with one segment deficient for MT-COI expression and at least one crypt, on the right side, undergoing fission into two crypts. Panel C shows, on the left side, a crypt fissioning into two crypts. Panel D shows typical small clusters of two and three MT-COI deficient crypts (the bar shows 50 μm). The images were made from original photomicrographs, but panels A, B and D were also included in an article and illustrations were published with Creative Commons Attribution-Noncommercial License allowing re-use.

The MT-COI protein, also known as CCOI, is usually expressed at a high level in the cytoplasm of colonic crypts of the human large intestine (colon). However, MT-COI is frequently lost in colonic crypts with age in humans and is also often absent in field defects that give rise to colon cancers as well as in portions of colon cancers.

The epithelial inner surface of the colon is punctuated by invaginations, the colonic crypts. The colon crypts are shaped like microscopic thick walled test tubes with a central hole down the length of the tube (the crypt lumen). Four tissue sections are shown in the image in this section, two cut across the long axes of the crypts and two cut parallel to the long axes.

Most of the human colonic crypts in the images have high expression of the brown-orange stained MT-COI. However, in some of the colonic crypts all of the cells lack MT-COI and appear mostly white, with their main color being the blue-gray staining of the nuclei at the outer walls of the crypts. Greaves et al. showed that deficiencies of MT-COI in colonic crypts are due to mutations in the MT-COI gene. As seen in panel B, a portion of the stem cells of three crypts appear to have a mutation in MT-COI, so that 40% to 50% of the cells arising from those stem cells form a white segment in the cross-cut area.

In humans, the percent of colonic crypts deficient for MT-COI is less than 1% before age 40, but then increases linearly with age. On average, the percent of colonic crypts deficient for MT-COI reaches 18% in women and 23% in men by 80–84 years of age. Colonic tumors often arise in a field of crypts containing a large cluster (as many as 410) of MT-COI-deficient crypts. In colonic cancers, up to 80% of tumor cells can be deficient in MT-COI.

As seen in panels C and D, crypts are about 75 to about 110 cells long. The average crypt circumference is 23 cells. Based on these measurements, crypts have between 1725 and 2530 cells. Another report gave a range of 1500 to 4900 cells per colonic crypt.

The occurrence of frequent crypts with almost complete loss of MT-COI in their 1700 to 5,000 cells suggests a process of natural selection. However, it has also been shown that a deficiency throughout a particular crypt due to an initial mitochondrial DNA mutation may occasionally occur through a stochastic process. Nevertheless, the frequent occurrence of MT-COI deficiency in many crypts within a colon epithelium indicates that absence of MT-COI likely provides a selective advantage.

MT-COI is coded for by the mitochondrial chromosome. There are multiple copies of the chromosome in most mitochondria, usually between 2 and 6 per mitochondrion. If a mutation occurs in MT-COI in one chromosome of a mitochondrion, there may be random segregation of the chromosomes during mitochondrial fission to generate new mitochondria. This can give rise to a mitochondrion with primarily or solely MT-COI-mutated chromosomes.

A mitochondrion with largely MT-COI-mutated chromosomes would need to have a positive selection bias in order to frequently become the main type of mitochondrion in a cell (a cell with MT-COI-deficient homoplasmy). There are about 100 to 700 mitochondria per cell, depending on cell type. Furthermore, there is fairly rapid turnover of mitochondria, so that a mitochondrion with MT-COI-mutated chromosomes and a positive selection bias could shortly become the major type of mitochondrion in a cell. The average half-life of mitochondria in rats, depending on cell type, is between 9 and 24 days, and in mice is about 2 days. In humans it is likely that the half life of mitochondria is also a matter of days to weeks.

A stem cell at the base of a colonic crypt that was largely MT-COI-deficient may compete with the other 4 or 5 stem cells to take over the stem cell niche. If this occurs, then the colonic crypt would be deficient in MT-COI in all 1700 to 5,000 cells, as is indicated for some crypts in panels A, B and D of the image.

Crypts of the colon can reproduce by fission, as seen in panel C, where a crypt is fissioning to form two crypts, and in panel B where at least one crypt appears to be fissioning. Most crypts deficient in MT-COI are in clusters of crypts (clones of crypts) with two or more MT-COI-deficient crypts adjacent to each other (see panel D). This illustrates that clones of deficient crypts often arise, and thus that there is likely a positive selective bias that has allowed them to spread in the human colonic epithelium.

It is not clear why a deficiency of MT-COI should have a positive selective bias. One suggestion is that deficiency of MT-COI in a mitochondrion leads to lower reactive oxygen production (and less oxidative damage) and this provides a selective advantage in competition with other mitochondria within the same cell to generate homoplasmy for MT-COI-deficiency. Another suggestion was that cells with a deficiency in cytochrome c oxidase are apoptosis resistant, and thus more likely to survive. The linkage of MT-COI to apoptosis arises because active cytochrome c oxidase oxidizes cytochrome c, which then activates pro-caspase 9, leading to apoptosis. These two factors may contribute to the frequent occurrence of MT-COI-deficient colonic crypts with age or during carcinogenesis in the human colon.

== Interactions ==
Within the MITRAC (mitochondrial translation regulation assembly intermediate of cytochrome c oxidase) complex, the encoded protein interacts with COA3 and SMIM20/MITRAC7. This interaction with SMIM20 stabilizes the newly synthesized MT-CO1 and prevents its premature turnover. Additionally, it interacts with TMEM177 in a COX20-dependent manner.
