= Nicotinic acid adenine dinucleotide phosphate =

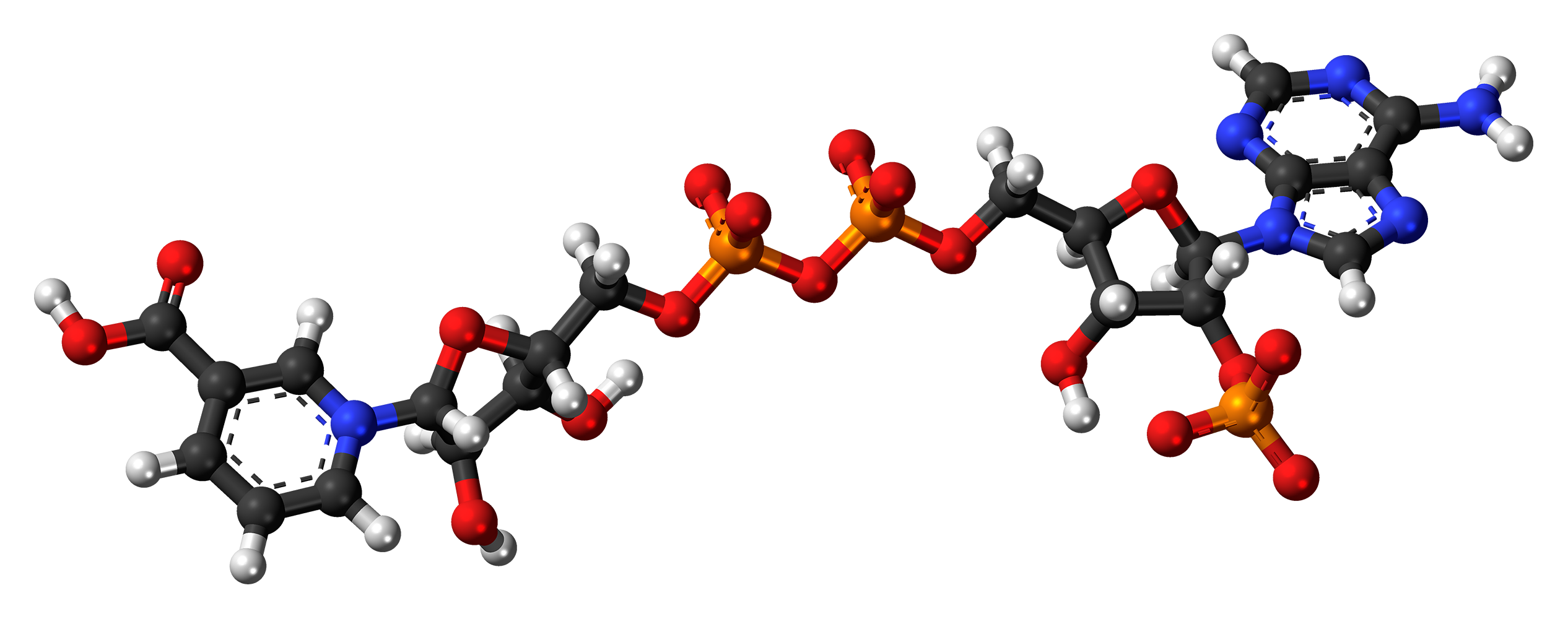

Identifiers
CAS Number	5502-96-5
3D model (JSmol)	Interactive image
ChemSpider	110475
ECHA InfoCard	100.164.946
IUPHAR/BPS	2450
PubChem CID	123953
- InChI: InChI=1S/C21H27N6O18P3/c22-17-12-18(24-7-23-17)27(8-25-12)20-16(44-46(33,34)35)14(29)11(43-20)6-41-48(38,39)45-47(36,37)40-5-10-13(28)15(30)19(42-10)26-3-1-2-9(4-26)21(31)32/h1-4,7-8,10-11,13-16,19-20,28-30H,5-6H2,(H6-,22,23,24,31,32,33,34,35,36,37,38,39)/p+1/t10-,11-,13-,14-,15-,16-,19-,20-/m1/s1 Key: QOTXBMGJKFVZRD-HISDBWNOSA-O
- SMILES: c1cc(c[n+](c1)[C@H]2[C@@H]([C@@H]([C@H](O2)COP(=O)(O)OP(=O)(O)OC[C@@H]3[C@H]([C@H]([C@@H](O3)n4cnc5c4ncnc5N)OP(=O)(O)O)O)O)O)C(=O)O

Properties
Chemical formula	[C_{21}H_{28}N_{6}O_{18}P_{3}]^{+}
Molar mass	745.398 g/mol
- Except where otherwise noted, data are given for materials in their standard state (at 25 °C [77 °F], 100 kPa). verify (what is ?) Infobox references

Nicotinic acid adenine dinucleotide phosphate (NAADP) is a Ca^{2+}-mobilizing second messenger synthesised in response to extracellular stimuli. Like its mechanistic cousins, IP_{3} and cyclic adenosine diphosphoribose (Cyclic ADP-ribose), NAADP binds to and opens Ca^{2+} channels on intracellular organelles, thereby increasing the intracellular Ca^{2+} concentration which, in turn, modulates sundry cellular processes (see Calcium signalling). Structurally, it is a dinucleotide that only differs from the house-keeping enzyme cofactor, NADP by a hydroxyl group (replacing the nicotinamide amino group) and yet this minor modification converts it into the most potent Ca^{2+}-mobilizing second messenger yet described. NAADP acts across phyla from plants to humans.

== Discovery ==
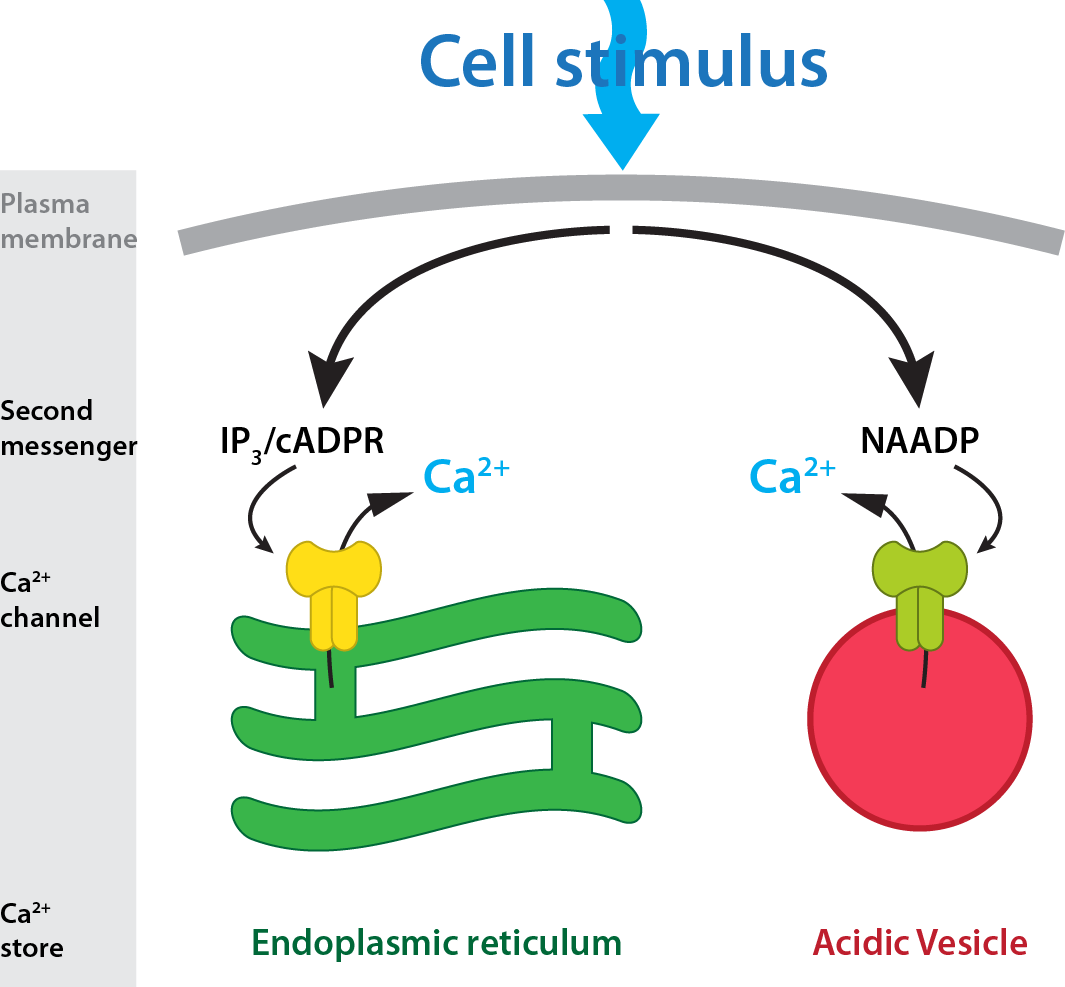
Cell stimuli select different Ca^{2+} stores by synthesising different second messengers. Shown for comparison are the ER-targeting messengers, IP_{3} and cADPR.

In their landmark 1987 paper, Hon Cheung Lee and colleagues discovered not one but two Ca^{2+}-mobilizing second messengers, cADPR and NAADP from the effects of nucleotides on Ca^{2+} release in sea urchin egg homogenates. It turns out that NAADP was a contaminant in commercial sources of NADP, but it was not until 1995 that its structure was solved. The first demonstration that NAADP could act in mammalian cells (pancreas) came four years later. Subsequently, NAADP has been detected in sources as diverse as human sperm, red and white blood cells, liver, and pancreas, to name but a few.

== Synthesis and degradation ==
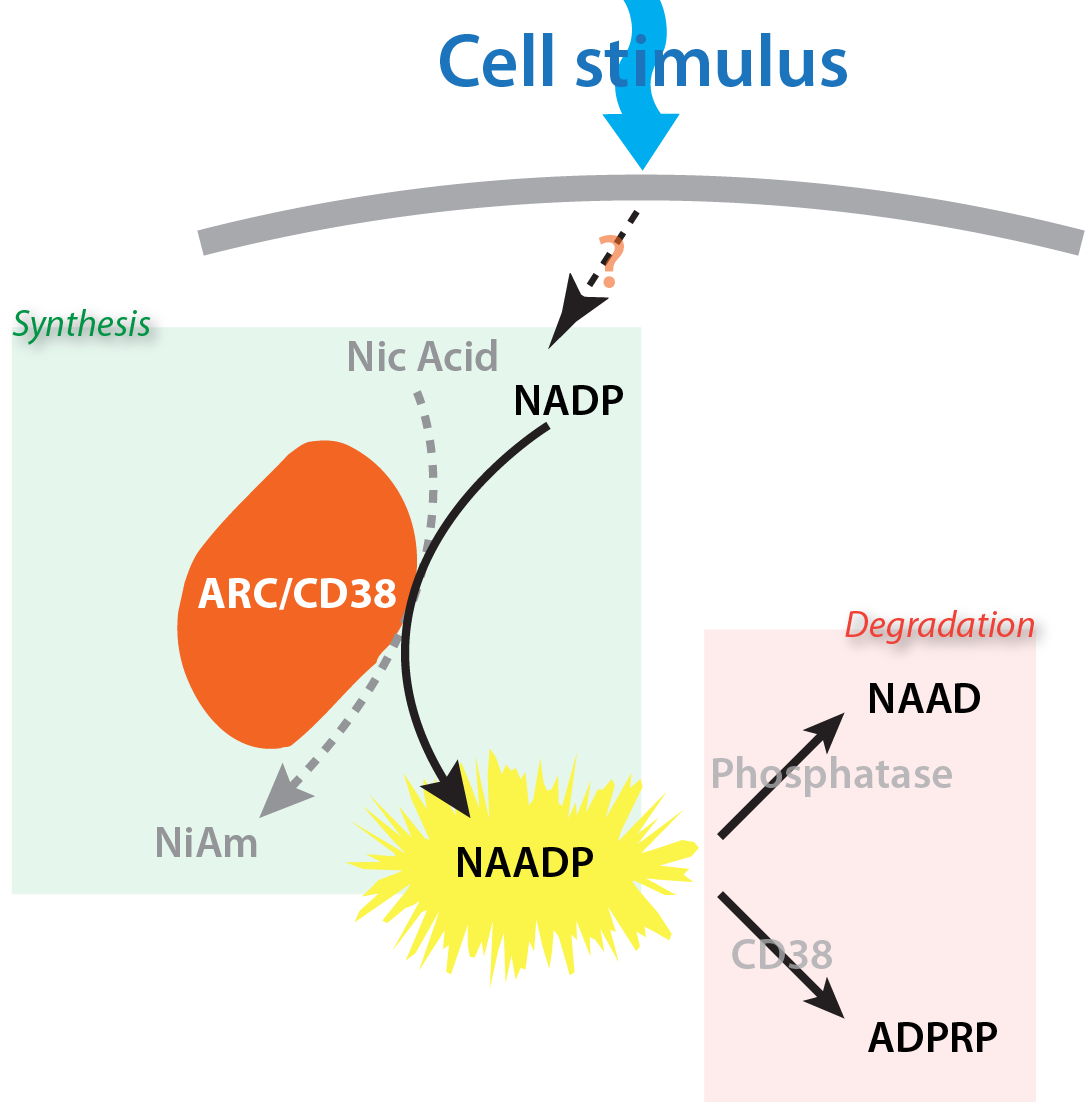
Speculative pathways for NAADP synthesis and degradation. ADP-ribosyl cyclase (ARC) family members (such as CD38) can synthesise NAADP via the base-exchange reaction (NicAcid, Nicotinic Acid; NiAm, nicotinamide). NAADP may be broken down to NAAD via a Ca^{2+}-sensitive phosphatase, or to 2-phosphoadenosine diphosphoribose (ADPRP) by CD38 itself. For simplicity, enzyme topology has been ignored (see below).

=== Kinetics and transduction ===
The first demonstration that NAADP levels increase in response to an extracellular stimulus arose from studying sea urchin fertilization (NAADP changed in both the eggs and sperm upon contact). Subsequently, other cell types have followed suit, as exemplified by the pancreas (acinar and beta cells), T-cells, and smooth muscle. Levels increase very rapidly — and possibly precede the increase in the other messengers IP_{3} and cADPR— but can be very transient (spiking and returning to basal levels within seconds). The transduction mechanisms that couple cell stimuli to such NAADP increases are ill-defined, with some suggestions of cyclic AMP or cytosolic Ca^{2+} itself stimulating synthesis.

=== Synthetic enzymes ===
Regardless of the details, an outstanding issue is that the physiological route of NAADP synthesis has still not been unequivocally identified — neither the reaction(s) nor the enzyme(s). Clearly, it is theoretically possible there may be multiple routes of synthesis, but this would be unprecedented in the second messenger world. To date, the most favoured hypothesis is the so-called base-exchange reaction (nicotinic acid + NADP → NAADP + nicotinamide; catalyzed by ADP-ribosyl cyclases) which are a family of enzymes that include CD38 and CD157 in mammals (and orthologs in sea urchin and Aplysia ovotestis). These were first discovered as the synthetic enzymes for cADPR but later revealed to be multifunctional, promiscuous enzymes that can also produce NAADP. Certainly NAADP production can occur in vitro but whether it occurs in vivo is another question (because genetic knockout or knock-down of ADP-ribosyl cyclases has no effect on NAADP production in some cell types), and there may be other routes which require different substrates and enzymes.

The SARM1 enzyme also catalyzes the formation of NAADP from NAD+.

The first chemical synthesis of NAADP was achieved in 2004 using a chemoenzymatic approach: a total chemical synthesis of NADP and then conversion of this to NAADP enzymatically.

=== Degradative enzymes ===
Like any second messenger system, the signal must be terminated and there must be routes for NAADP removal but again, little is known with any degree of certainty. A 2'-3'-phosphatase stimulated by Ca^{2+} has been proposed in brain and, possibly in pancreatic acinar cells, that catabolises NAADP to inactive NAAD. CD38 has also been found to breakdown NAADP (to ADPRP — see inset). NAADP may also be reduced to NAADPH.

=== NAADP-selective physiology ===
Hardly surprisingly, the three major second messengers do not do the same thing and cannot always substitute for each other. The physiological consequences of Ca^{2+} release by each messenger may be different i.e. NAADP couples to downstream responses that cannot be mimicked by IP3 and cADPR. For example, NAADP selectively stimulates neuronal differentiation, or exocytosis in cytotoxic T-cells.

== Target organelle ==
In contrast to IP3 and cyclic ADP-ribose which predominantly mobilize Ca^{2+} from the neutral and abundant endoplasmic reticulum (ER) store, NAADP selectively targets acidic Ca^{2+} stores — usually less abundant than the ER but with a pivotal role that belies their size. This paradigm shift away from the ER derives from seminal studies, again in sea urchin egg, that showed NAADP-mediated Ca^{2+} release was sensitive to agents that target acidic organelles (e.g. bafilomycin A1) but was less sensitive to ones that interfere with ER Ca^{2+} storage (e.g. thapsigargin).

=== Acidic Ca^{2+} store ===
This is a blanket term that encompasses a spectrum of acidic vesicles that include endosomes, lysosomes, and lysosome-related organelles and secretory vesicles and acidocalcisomes. They are a highly dynamic continuum of vesicles with a rich variety of established biochemical roles in cells, to which Ca^{2+} storage can now be added. Their luminal pH is one characteristic that distinguishes a given vesicle class from another: where endosomes are weakly acidic (pH 6-6.5), lysosomes are typically the most acidic (pH 4.5-5.0) and secretory vesicles are typically pH 5.5. Ca^{2+} is seen to be increasingly important for endo-lysosomal function, e.g. trafficking and autophagy. Aberrations in Ca^{2+} signals can have pathophysiological consequences, including lysosomal storage diseases such as Niemann–Pick disease, type C and Mucolipidosis IV.

When NAADP mobilizes Ca^{2+} from these stores, the pH of the stores concomitantly increases (becomes more alkaline), as testified by studies in sea urchin egg, mammalian heart and pancreas. Whether this has consequences for vesicle (or NAADP) function remains to be seen, but luminal pH is usually crucial for resident protein activity.

=== Ca^{2+} uptake ===
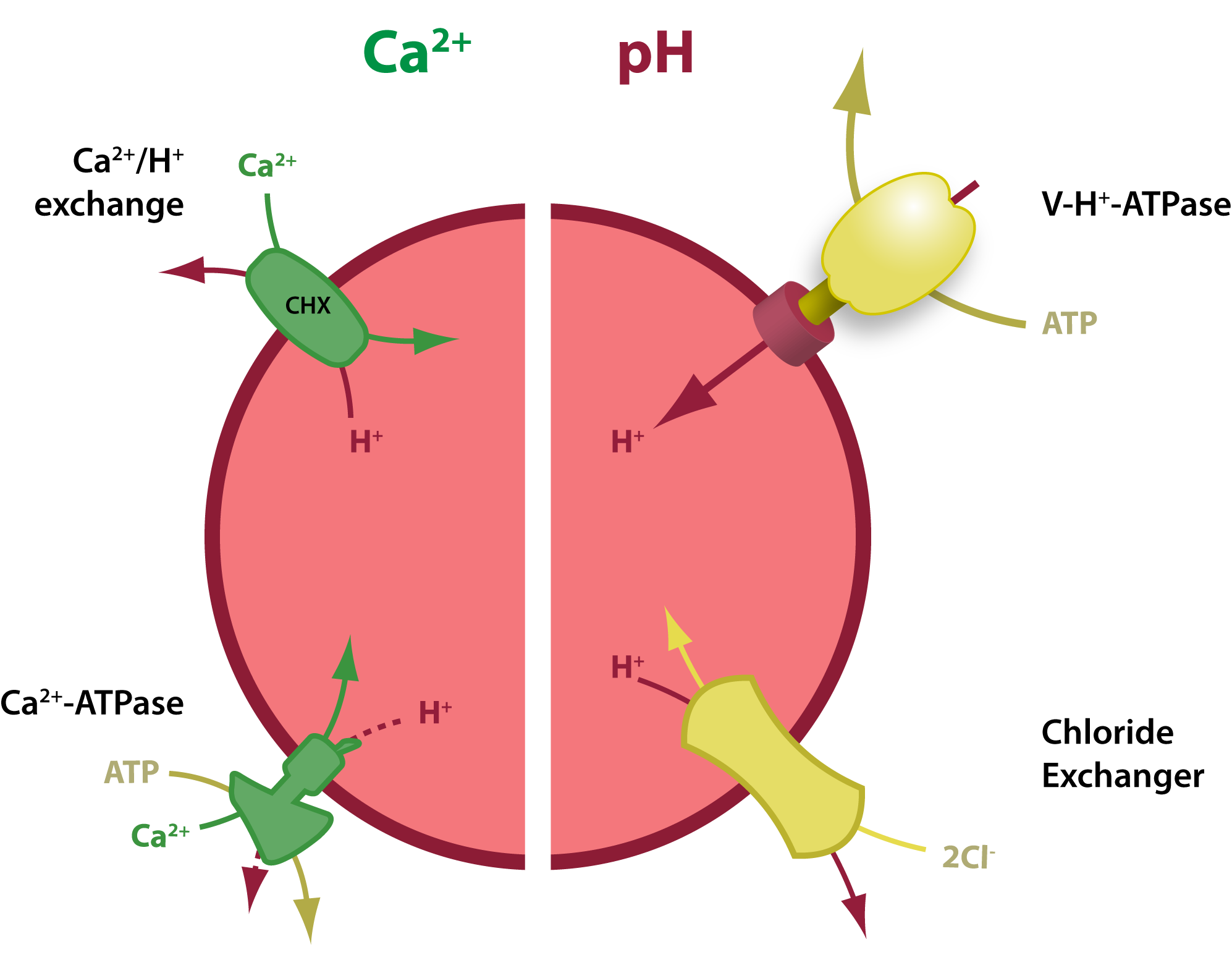
Simplified pathways regulating luminal Ca^{2+} (left) and pH (right) in acidic organelles. Ca^{2+} uptake can be mediated either by a Ca^{2+}/H^{+} exchanger (CHX, that exploits the pH gradient) or a Ca^{2+} pump (powered by ATP hydrolysis). The low luminal pH is driven by the H^{+} pump, the V-ATPase, and aided by essential counterion movements, e.g. chloride uptake, that acts as a charge shunt essential for optimal proton uptake.

In other Ca^{2+}-storing organelles such as the endoplasmic reticulum or Golgi, stores are filled by calcium ATPase pumps, typified by the ubiquitous members of the SERCA or the SPCA (secretory pathway Ca^{2+}-ATPase) families respectively. Ca^{2+} uptake by acidic stores occurs via other proteins: in yeast and plants (the best understood systems) the acidic vacuoles host two uptake pathways: a high affinity Ca^{2+}-ATPase and a low affinity Ca^{2+}/H^{+} antiporter (or exchanger, generically denoted as CHX). The pumps are different from the SERCA family (and, importantly, are insensitive to their inhibitor, thapsigargin) whereas the exchanger exploit the H^{+} gradient to drive Ca^{2+} uptake against its concentration gradient. The genes encoding these proteins are well-defined.

In higher organisms, the situation is less clear. Ca^{2+} uptake usually occurs via a thapsigargin-insensitive pathway (therefore precluding SERCA involvement) and appears to be dependent upon the H^{+} gradient; whether this occurs via a single (unknown) CHX or via exchangers in series (e.g. Na^{+}/H^{+} exchanger coupled to a Na^{+}/Ca^{2+} exchanger) is unproven. Acidic vesicles in some cell types may well take a leaf out of the yeasts'/plants' book and host two uptake pathways, but whether this is a widespread template is unclear.

In the absence of selective Ca^{2+} uptake inhibitors (often because we do not even know the protein/route), it is common to indirectly inhibit Ca^{2+} uptake by collapsing the thermodynamic drive (the H^{+} gradient). The H^{+} gradient can be eliminated either with H^{+} ionophores (protonophores) such as nigericin or monensin or by inhibiting the V-ATPase that generates the H^{+} gradient with compounds such as bafilomycin A1 or concanamycin.

== Target channel (two pore channels or TPCs) ==
Even from the early pioneering work in sea urchin egg, it was clear from the pharmacological profile that NAADP acted upon a different channel from the IP3 receptor and ryanodine receptor and this has recently been borne out by the molecular identification of the NAADP receptor as members of the TPC (two-pore channel) family. As structural intermediates between single domain TRP and four-domain voltage-dependent calcium channel, the TPCs form oligomers (possibly dimers) to form the functional Ca^{2+} channel. Appropriately, these channels reside on acidic organelles (including different classes of endosomes and lysosomes) likely due to the presence of endolysomal targeting sequences.

The effect of genetic manipulation of TPC levels (i.e. over-expression, knock-down or knock-out) is consistent with TPCs being the NAADP-gated channel. Moreover, TPCs recapitulate many of the characteristics of NAADP-induced Ca^{2+} release i.e. they promote Ca^{2+} release from acidic stores, correlate with NAADP-binding sites, exhibit a bell-shaped NAADP concentration-response curve, sensitivity to the NAADP antagonist, Ned-19, and provide trigger Ca^{2+} that is subsequently amplified by ER Ca^{2+} channels.

=== Isoforms ===
There are 3 genes that encode three isoforms of TPC1-3 that differ substantially from each other in their primary sequence (but these differences are preserved across species, such that human and sea urchin TPC1 are more closely related than are human TPC1 and human TPC2). Moreover, the TPC isoforms exhibit different organellar distributions, with TPC1 being found throughout the endo-lysosomal system (although predominantly in recycling and early endosomes) whereas TPC2 shows a more restricted late-endosomal/lysosomal localization.

=== Controversy and plasticity ===
In spite of a burgeoning literature supporting TPCs as the NAADP-regulated channel, this was challenged in 2012/13 by reports that TPCs are, instead, Na^{+} channels regulated by the endo-lysosomal lipid, Phosphatidylinositol 3,5-bisphosphate, PI(3,5)P_{2} and also by metabolic state (via ATP and mTOR). This controversy ultimately evolved into a new model of how TPCs work.

The challenge raised two different, but interrelated issues: (a) TPCs are insensitive to NAADP; (b) TPCs are Na^{+}- (and not Ca^{2+}-) permeable.

==== NAADP does activate TPCs ====
The surprising conclusion in 2012 that TPCs are not involved in NAADP signalling was due to two technical difficulties that have since been overcome or explained.

(i) The transgenic mice (designed to knockout both TPC1 and TPC2; double-knockout, DKO) retained sensitivity to NAADP. However, others have questioned whether these mice are true DKO when they are predicted to retain >90% of the TPC protein sequences (i.e. they express only mildly truncated TPCs which are still functional and NAADP-sensitive). In a different DKO mouse that is demonstrably TPC-null, NAADP responses are completely abolished, confirming TPCs are an NAADP target.

(ii) The authors could not observe NAADP-stimulated currents in patched lysosomes. These technically challenging protocols were overcome by others who have successfully observed NAADP-dependent lysosomal currents that are dependent on TPCs.

==== Ionic selectivity and plasticity ====
Several groups reinvestigated the permeability properties of TPCs and their role in NAADP-induced Ca^{2+} release, and they agreed that TPCs are indeed permeable to Na^{+} but they could not necessarily recapitulate the Na^{+} selectivity shown in the 2012/13 studies. It was therefore initially proposed that TPCs may conduct both Ca^{2+} and Na^{+} (analogous to the NMDA receptor of the plasma membrane).

As more studies were published, why some groups observe a Na^{+} selectivity while others see a mixed Na^{+}/Ca^{2+} permeability was unclear until the important realization that the TPC2 ionic selectivity wholly depended on the activating ligand. Currents activated by PI(3,5)P_{2} were predominantly carried by Na^{+} whereas NAADP-activated currents showed an eight-fold increase in the Ca^{2+} permeability. This conveniently explained the discrepancies between groups as well as revealing that TPC2 is extraordinarily plastic in operating in different conductance modalities.

Since then, it appears that TPC2 can be synergistically activated by co-application of NAADP and PI(3,5)P_{2}, although the molecular mechanisms are unclear.

Therefore, TPC2 can operate as either a Ca^{2+} or Na^{+} channel, depending on whether NAADP or lipid activate it.

=== NAADP binding proteins ===
IP3 binds directly to its cognate IP3 receptor which is therefore a true ligand-gated ion channel. In contrast, NAADP does not appear to bind directly to TPCs but requires an intermediate unknown accessory protein(s). In sea urchin egg homogenate and T-cells, the binding protein(s) may be smaller than TPCs themselves, judging by photoaffinity labelling with [^{32}P]azido-NAADP. Therefore, the NAADP receptor was believed to be a multi-protein complex on acidic vesicles.

In spite of a decade of graft using conventional biochemical purification, these proteins remained elusive. Recently, two different NAADP-binding proteins have finally been identified that are essential for TPC activation: LSm12 and JPT2.

==== JPT2 ====
The 20kDa Jupiter microtubule-associated homolog 2 (JPT2) (also known as HN1L) was the first accessory protein to be published as a mediator of NAADP-dependent Ca^{2+} release. Both studies exploited the same novel 'clickable' NAADP photoprobe, but regardless of the different blood cell types, the authors converged on the same molecular partner (although the studies differ in the channel that is activated). JPT2 binds [^{32}P]NAADP with selectivity over a spectrum of different nucleotides. In Ca^{2+}-release studies, NAADP-dependent signals were inhibited by siRNA knockdown of JPT2, but not of its homolog, JPT1, attesting to isoform specificity. Interestingly, JPT2 exhibited a preferential interaction with TPC1 over TPC2. Given that TPCs are known to drive pathogen uptake into cells, it was striking that uptake of a Severe acute respiratory syndrome coronavirus 2 (SARS-CoV-2) pseudovirus was likewise reduced by JPT2 gene silencing.

==== LSm12 ====
Using entirely different affinity techniques, other workers unexpectedly identified a member of an RNA-binding protein LSm family (LSm12) as an NAADP-dependent accessory protein for TPCs. Composed of two domains (an N-terminus LSm domain and a C-terminus anticodon-binding [AD] domain), LSm12 mediates NAADP activation of TPCs via its LSm domain. This domain binds NAADP with appropriate nanomolar affinity and selectivity over NADP, and appears to be needed for activation of either TPC1 or TPC2 (contrasting with the isoform-selectivity of JPT2). Other LSm family members (5 and 11) were not required.

The fact that two entirely different proteins potentially converge on the activation of TPCs raises future questions of whether both NAADP-binding proteins are part of a common complex or pathway.

=== Regulatory factors ===
==== Luminal ions ====
In addition to NAADP gating the channel, there is evidence that the luminal pH also affects TPC channel activity, either TPC1 or TPC2 . However, a clear consensus on the effect of pH has not been reached with some suggesting that acidic pH favours TPC1 or TPC2 opening, whereas others report that a more alkaline pH favours TPC2 opening.

Furthermore, luminal Ca^{2+} also promotes TPC1 and TPC2 opening (in the latter case, luminal Ca^{2+} also sensitizes TPCs to NAADP (analogous to luminal Ca^{2+} regulation of IP3Rs and RyRs), but this demands wider study across isoforms and species. This is one way by which cross-talk can occur between acidic Ca^{2+} stores and the ER i.e. Ca^{2+} release from the ER can 'prime' acidic Ca^{2+} stores and promote further NAADP-dependent Ca^{2+} responses .

==== Cytosolic ions ====
Early evidence was against the NAADP receptor being regulated by either cytosolic Ca^{2+} or pH. Since then, Ca^{2+} has been shown to stimulate human TPC1 on both its cytosolic and luminal faces.

== Pharmacology ==
=== NAADP inhibitors ===
Back in 2009, a selective cell-permeant NAADP antagonist, trans-Ned-19 was discovered which blocks Ca^{2+} signals and downstream Ca^{2+}-dependent processes such as differentiation. Prior to that, only high concentrations of blockers of L-type Ca^{2+} channels (e.g. diltiazem, dihydropyridines) could be used (with obvious concerns over non-NAADP effects). A minor modification of Ned-19 produced another, more soluble antagonist, Ned-K.

Although not true antagonism, the NAADP 'receptor' can self-inactivate when bound to non-releasing concentrations of NAADP itself. Such inactivating pre-pulses of NAADP were the first strategy for implicating NAADP in subsequent physiological pathways.

=== NAADP activators ===
NAADP is charged and cannot cross cell membranes. Therefore, an inactive, lipophilic ester precursor (NAADP/AM) has been synthesised which crosses membranes and rapidly regenerates NAADP in the cytosol following the action of endogenous esterases.

Caged NAADP is an inactive, membrane-impermeant analog of NAADP that can be introduced into cells by microinjection or a patch pipette. Flash photolysis with a UV light source rapidly converts this into NAADP, allowing the experimenter to precisely manipulate NAADP levels in time and space.

=== Ca^{2+} storage ===
An indirect means of inhibiting NAADP action is to deplete its target Ca^{2+} stores. As noted above, this usually entails collapsing the H^{+} gradient with either V-ATPase inhibitors (e.g. Bafilomycin A1) or protonophores (e.g. nigericin or monensin). In platelets it has been suggested that SERCA3 inhibition with tBHQ can also abrogate NAADP-dependent signals.

== Transport ==
The two paralogous enzymes- transmembrane CD38 and GPI anchored CD157, that produce NAADP (and cADPR) in humans both have their active synthesis site in the ectodomain. Though this may involve vesicular synthesis but it has been shown that it is produced at the extracellular sites, and also can act when produced by a different cell or added artificially from outside. So the NAADP has to enter the cell either by diffusion or by transport. Considering the fact that the substrate of NAADP synthesis (NADP) itself is very sparse in the extracellular medium, a purse diffusion based mechanism has been suspected to be less likely than a transporter mediated path. This is compatible with recent data which indicate a carrier mediated transport partially blockable by dipyridamole and cold temperature.

== Lysosomal Ca^{2+}-signalling modalities ==
The ER and acidic Ca^{2+} stores have similarities as well as key differences. Both transport Ca^{2+} into their lumina where it is stored, and is subsequently released in response to stimuli by opening resident Ca^{2+} channels. Indeed, the free [Ca^{2+}] of each is broadly similar (~0.5-1.0 mM). However, they differ in the cohort of transporters, their luminal pH and their total volume per cell. The total amount of Ca^{2+} that is stored in each is a product of the volume and concentration; since the [Ca^{2+}] is the same for each, the total amount of releasable Ca^{2+} is directly proportional to the organellar volume and therefore lysosomes can release only a small amount Ca^{2+} of when compared to the ER.

This is important because the maximal Ca^{2+} release from lysosomes is so small that it is frequently 'invisible' in global Ca^{2+} recordings e.g. using cytosolic fluorescent reporters. In contrast, ER-derived Ca^{2+} is globally substantial and the predominant intracellular signal visible in global recordings.

If lysosomal Ca^{2+} release is so small, how then can it affect cellular physiology? The answer is that it can exert its effects in two different signalling modalities: local and global, as shall be described.

In bacterial infection, however, NAADP induction of lysosomal Ca^{2+} efflux and TFEB activation leads to enhanced expression of inflammatory cytokines.

=== Solo & local ===
Since the diffusion of Ca^{2+} in the cell is spatially restricted, Ca^{2+} released by a channel does not travel far from its source (the channel mouth) — model estimates are in the 50 nm range. Therefore, the small total amount of Ca^{2+} released from lysosomal channels will form locally high [Ca^{2+}] domains around the cytosolic face of lysosomal Ca^{2+} channels. By strategic placement of Ca^{2+}-sensitive decoding proteins within these domains (e.g. in a complex with the channel), local Ca^{2+} signals can stimulate Ca^{2+}-dependent events — crucially, even in the absence of a global cytosolic Ca^{2+} signal. This is the modality when lysosomes are acting on their own.

The NAADP/TPC axis has been reported to exhibit such signal compartmentation, such local Ca^{2+} signalling, in different physiological settings. In other words, this local modality can explain why some processes are driven uniquely by NAADP/TPCs rather than other Ca^{2+} signalling pathways. For example, NAADP/TPCs are unique drivers of cell killing by Cytotoxic T cells. Similarly, phagocytosis via the Fc receptor in the macrophage is driven only by highly local Ca^{2+} domains generated by NAADP/TPCs (whereas the global ER Ca^{2+} signals play no role). This unique dependence is not restricted to immune cells, but is also observed in neurons during long-term potentiation, and neuronal differentiation. Angiogenesis is another NAADP/TPC-dependent pathway.

=== Combined & global ===
A different modality is when lysosomes do not just act alone, but in concert with the ER. In this scenario, lysosomes first supply a local, 'trigger' Ca^{2+} release that then secondarily recruits the IP3Rs or RyRs on the ER by Calcium-induced calcium release (the 'amplifier'). In this mode, lysosomes indirectly evoke a global cytosolic Ca^{2+} signal (which is actually mediated by the ER). In this way, lysosomal Ca^{2+} release is amplified, in what is referred to as the 'trigger hypothesis'.

== See also ==
- Cyclic ADP-ribose
- IP3
