= Streptomyces flavotricini =

Scientific classification
- Domain: Bacteria
- Kingdom: Bacillati
- Phylum: Actinomycetota
- Class: Actinomycetes
- Order: Streptomycetales
- Family: Streptomycetaceae
- Genus: Streptomyces
- Species: S. flavotricini

Binomial name
- Streptomyces flavotricini (Preobrazhenskaya and Sveshnikova 1957) Pridham et al. 1958 (Approved Lists 1980)

Type strain
- ATCC 19757, ATCC 23621, BCRC 13762, CBS 495.68, CCRC 13762, CGMCC 4.1959, DSM 40152, IFO 12770, IMET 42057, INA 11669/58, ISP 5152, JCM 4371, KCC S-0371, NBRC 12770, NRRL B-5419, NRRL-ISP 5152, RIA 10, RIA 1037, UNIQEM 143, VKM Ac-1277

Synonyms
- "Actinomyces flavotricini" Preobrazhenskaya and Sveshnikova 1957

Species of bacteria

Streptomyces flavotricini is a bacterium species from the genus of Streptomyces which has been isolated from mountain forest soil. Streptomyces flavotricini produces bafilomycin K and aminoacylase.

== See also ==
- List of Streptomyces species
