= CD38-IN-78c =

Chemical compound

Identifiers
- IUPAC name: 4-{[(1R,4R)-4-(2-methoxyethoxy)cyclohexyl]amino}-1-methyl-6-(1,3-thiazol-5-yl)quinolin-2-one
- CAS Number: 1700637-55-3
- PubChem CID: 118736856
- ChemSpider: 107562966
- ChEMBL: ChEMBL3426034

Chemical and physical data
- Formula: C_{22}H_{27}N_{3}O_{3}S
- Molar mass: 413.54 g·mol^{−1}
- 3D model (JSmol): Interactive image
- SMILES: CN1C2=C(C=C(C=C2)C3=CN=CS3)C(=CC1=O)NC4CCC(CC4)OCCOC
- InChI: InChI=1S/C22H27N3O3S/c1-25-20-8-3-15(21-13-23-14-29-21)11-18(20)19(12-22(25)26)24-16-4-6-17(7-5-16)28-10-9-27-2/h3,8,11-14,16-17,24H,4-7,9-10H2,1-2H3; Key:VJQALSOBHVEJQM-UHFFFAOYSA-N

CD38-IN-78c is a drug which acts as a potent and selective inhibitor of the glycoprotein enzyme CD38. In animal studies it boosts levels of nicotinamide adenine dinucleotide (NAD+) in tissues via inhibition of CD38 mediated breakdown of nicotinamide riboside (NR) and nicotinamide mononucleotide (NMN), and has been shown to ameliorate metabolic dysfunction associated with the aging process. It also has potential therapeutic application in the treatment of Alzheimer's disease.
