= Cyclic ADP-ribose =

Identifiers
CAS Number	119340-53-3
3D model (JSmol)	Interactive image
ChEBI	CHEBI:31445
ChemSpider	21403087
ECHA InfoCard	100.162.252
IUPHAR/BPS	2445
MeSH	Cyclic+ADP-Ribose
PubChem CID	123847
UNII	Q780BR06V8
CompTox Dashboard (EPA)	DTXSID50896995
- InChI: InChI=1S/C15H21N5O13P2/c16-12-7-13-18-4-19(12)14-10(23)8(21)5(31-14)1-29-34(25,26)33-35(27,28)30-2-6-9(22)11(24)15(32-6)20(13)3-17-7/h3-6,8-11,14-16,21-24H,1-2H2,(H,25,26)(H,27,28)/t5-,6-,8-,9-,10-,11-,14-,15-/m1/s1 Key: BQOHYSXSASDCEA-KEOHHSTQSA-N; InChI=1/C15H21N5O13P2/c16-12-7-13-18-4-19(12)14-10(23)8(21)5(31-14)1-29-34(25,26)33-35(27,28)30-2-6-9(22)11(24)15(32-6)20(13)3-17-7/h3-6,8-11,14-16,21-24H,1-2H2,(H,25,26)(H,27,28)/t5-,6-,8-,9-,10-,11-,14-,15-/m1/s1 Key: BQOHYSXSASDCEA-KEOHHSTQBN
- SMILES: O[C@H]5[C@@H](O)[C@H]2O[C@@H]5COP(O)(=O)OP(O)(=O)OC[C@H]4O[C@@H](N3\C=N/c1c(ncn12)C3=N)[C@H](O)[C@@H]4O

Properties
Chemical formula	C_{15}H_{21}N_{5}O_{13}P_{2}
Molar mass	541.301
- Except where otherwise noted, data are given for materials in their standard state (at 25 °C [77 °F], 100 kPa). verify (what is ?) Infobox references

Cyclic ADP-ribose, frequently abbreviated as cADPR, is a cyclic adenine nucleotide (like cAMP) with two phosphate groups present on 5' OH of the adenosine (like ADP), further connected to another ribose at the 5' position, which, in turn, closes the cycle by glycosidic bonding to the nitrogen 1 (N^{1}) of the same adenine base (whose position N^{9} has the glycosidic bond to the other ribose). The N^{1}-glycosidic bond to adenine is what distinguishes cADPR from ADP-ribose (ADPR), the non-cyclic analog. cADPR is produced from nicotinamide adenine dinucleotide (NAD^{+}) by ADP-ribosyl cyclases (EC 3.2.2.5) as part of a second messenger system.

== Function ==
cADPR is a cellular messenger for calcium signaling. It stimulates calcium-induced calcium release at lower cytosolic concentrations of Ca^{2+}. The primary target of cADPR is the endoplasmic reticulum Ca^{2+} uptake mechanism. cADPR mobilizes Ca^{2+} from the endoplasmic reticulum by activation of ryanodine receptors, a critical step in muscle contraction.

cADPR also acts as an agonist for the TRPM2 channel, but less potently than ADPR. cADPR and ADPR act synergistically, with both molecules enhancing the action of the other molecule in activating the TRPM2 channel.

Potentiation of Ca^{2+} release by cADPR is mediated by increased accumulation of Ca^{2+} in the sarcoplasmic reticulum.

== Metabolism ==
cADPR and ADPR are synthesized from NAD^{+} by the bifunctional ectoenzymes of the CD38 family (also includes the GPI-anchored CD157 and the specific, monofunctional ADP ribosyl cyclase of the mollusc Aplysia). The same enzymes are also capable of hydrolyzing cADPR to ADPR. Catalysis proceeds via a covalently bound intermediate. The hydrolysis reaction is inhibited by ATP, and cADPR may accumulate. Synthesis and degradation of cADPR by enzymes of the CD38 family involve, respectively, the formation and the hydrolysis of the N^{1}-glycosidic bond. In 2009, the first enzyme able to hydrolyze the phosphoanhydride linkage of cADPR, i.e. the one between the two phosphate groups, was reported.

SARM1 and other TIR domain-containing proteins also catalyze the formation of cADPR from NAD^{+}.

== Isomers ==
Variants of cADPR that differ in their HPLC retention times compared to canonical cADPR have been identified as products of bacterial and plant TIR domain-containing enzymes. v-cADPR (also referred to as 2'cADPR or 1''-2' glycocyclic ADPR (gcADPR)) and v2-cADPR (also referred to as 3'cADPR or 1''-3' gcADPR) isomers are cyclized by O-glycosidic bond formation between the ribose moieties in ADPR. 3'cADPR produced by bacterial TIR domain-containing proteins can act as an activator of bacterial antiphage defense systems and as a suppressor of plant immunity.

== See also ==
- NAADP
- IP3
- ADP-ribose
