= NED-19 =

Chemical compound

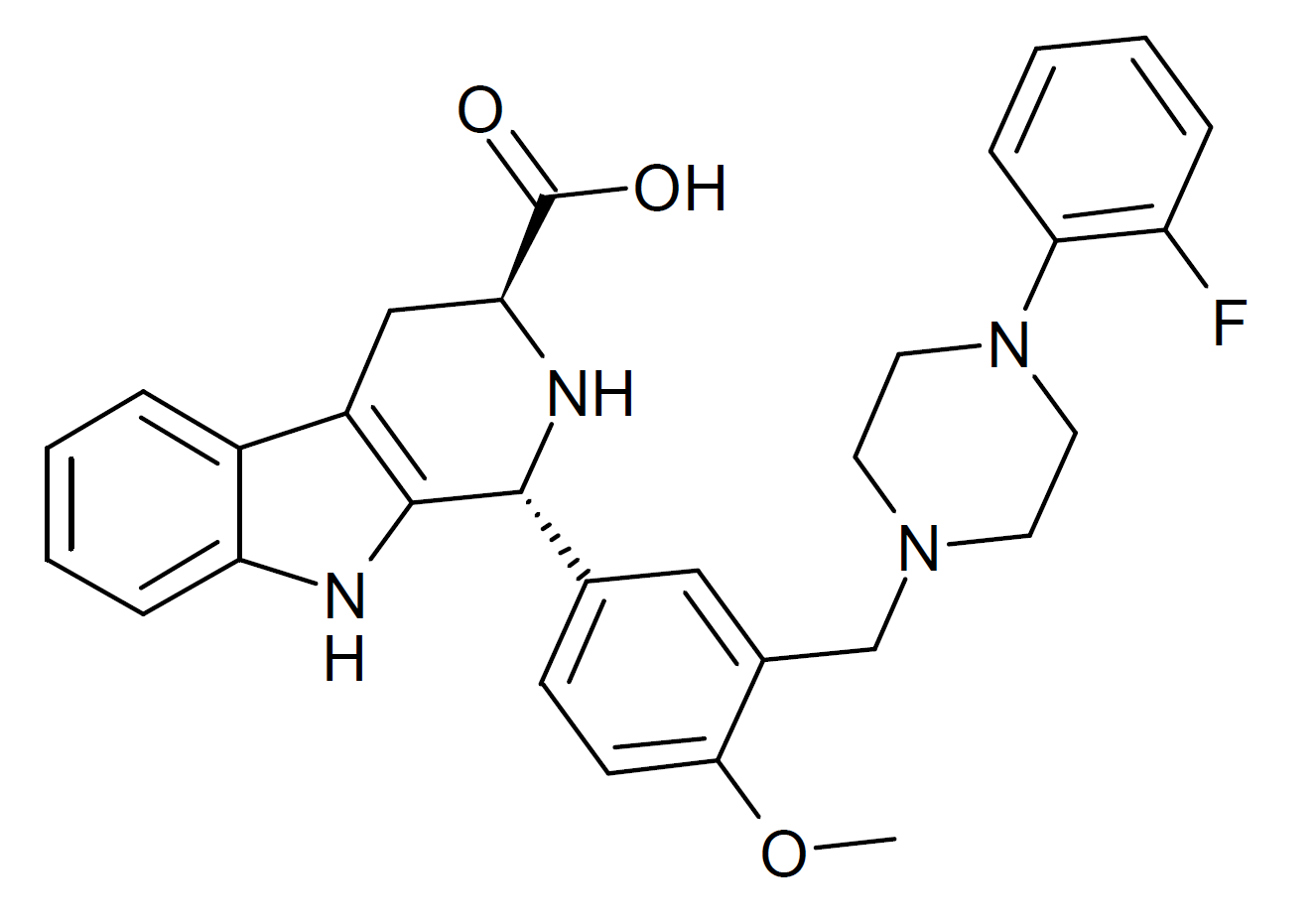

Identifiers
- IUPAC name: (1R,3S)-1-[3-[[4-(2-fluorophenyl)piperazin-1-yl]methyl]-4-methoxyphenyl]-2,3,4,9-tetrahydro-1H-pyrido[3,4-b]indole-3-carboxylic acid
- CAS Number: 1354235-96-3
- PubChem CID: 1427628
- ChemSpider: 24604981
- ChEBI: CHEBI:138526
- ChEMBL: ChEMBL1222013
- CompTox Dashboard (EPA): DTXSID501102307

Chemical and physical data
- Formula: C_{30}H_{31}FN_{4}O_{3}
- Molar mass: 514.601 g·mol^{−1}
- 3D model (JSmol): Interactive image
- SMILES: COC1=C(C=C(C=C1)[C@@H]2C3=C(C[C@H](N2)C(=O)O)C4=CC=CC=C4N3)CN5CCN(CC5)C6=CC=CC=C6F
- InChI: InChI=1S/C30H31FN4O3/c1-38-27-11-10-19(16-20(27)18-34-12-14-35(15-13-34)26-9-5-3-7-23(26)31)28-29-22(17-25(33-28)30(36)37)21-6-2-4-8-24(21)32-29/h2-11,16,25,28,32-33H,12-15,17-18H2,1H3,(H,36,37)/t25-,28+/m0/s1; Key:FUHCEERDBRGPQZ-LBNVMWSVSA-N

Trans-NED-19 is a drug which acts as a potent and selective antagonist of the endogenous calcium channel opener nicotinic acid adenine dinucleotide phosphate (NAADP), thereby reducing the normal NAADP-mediated calcium flux without blocking calcium channels directly. It is used in research into the functions of NAADP signalling inside many different cell types.
