= CD38 =

Protein found in humans

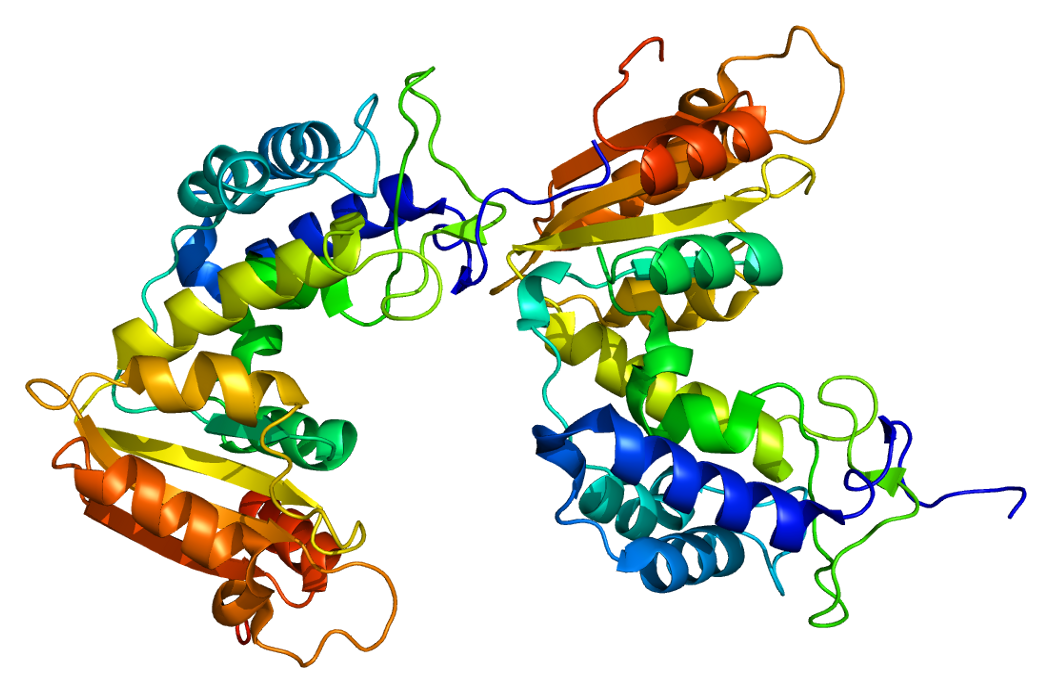

Identifiers
- Aliases: CD38, ADPRC1, ADPRC 1, CD38 molecule
- External IDs: OMIM: 107270; MGI: 107474; GeneCards: CD38
Available structures
PDB	Ortholog search: PDBe RCSB
PDB	List of PDB id codes 4TMF, 1YH3, 1ZVM, 2EF1, 2HCT, 2I65, 2I66, 2I67, 2O3Q, 2O3R, 2O3S, 2O3T, 2O3U, 2PGJ, 2PGL, 3DZF, 3DZG, 3DZH, 3DZI, 3DZJ, 3DZK, 3F6Y, 3I9M, 3I9N, 3OFS, 3RAJ, 3ROK, 3ROM, 3ROP, 3ROQ, 3U4H, 3U4I, 4CMH, 4F45, 4F46, 4OGW, 4XJS, 4XJT, 5F1K, 5F1O, 5F21
Enzyme activity
EC #	BRENDA	ExPASy	KEGG	MetaCyc
2.4.99.20	↗	↗	↗	↗
3.2.2.6	↗	↗	↗	↗

Gene location (Human)
Chr.	Chromosome 4 (human)
Band	4p15.32	Start	15,778,275 bp
Band	4p15.32	End	15,853,232 bp

Gene location (Mouse)
Chr.	Chromosome 5 (mouse)
Band	5 B3|5 23.85 cM	Start	44,025,895 bp
Band	5 B3|5 23.85 cM	End	44,069,717 bp
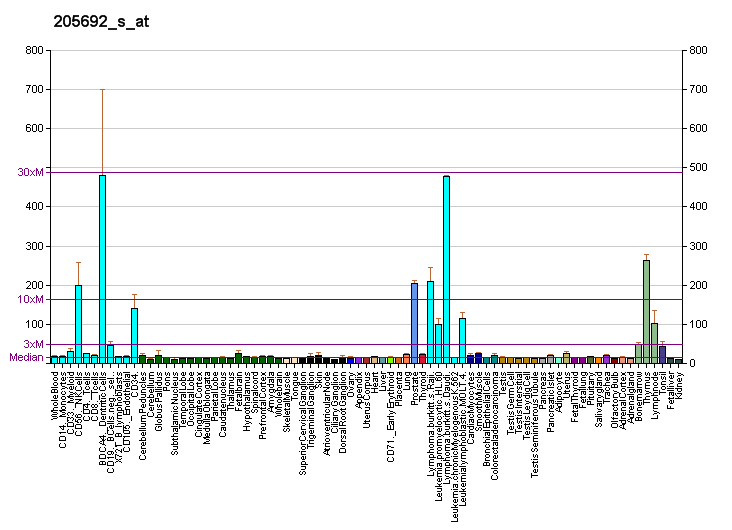
RNA expression pattern
Bgee	Human / Mouse (ortholog); Top expressed in: seminal vesicula; bone marrow cell; lymph node; thymus; appendix; spleen; bronchial epithelial cell; gonad; granulocyte; muscle of thigh / Top expressed in: stroma of bone marrow; left colon; seminal vesicula; spleen; mesenteric lymph nodes; Paneth cell; jejunum; lumbar subsegment of spinal cord; left lung lobe; duodenum; More reference expression data
BioGPS	More reference expression data
Gene ontology
Molecular function	transferase activity; hydrolase activity, acting on glycosyl bonds; NAD(P)+ nucleosidase activity; hydrolase activity; NAD+ nucleotidase, cyclic ADP-ribose generating; NAD+ nucleosidase activity; phosphorus-oxygen lyase activity; identical protein binding
Cellular component	integral component of membrane; membrane; intracellular membrane-bounded organelle; cell surface; extracellular exosome; nucleus; plasma membrane; basolateral plasma membrane; secretory granule membrane
Biological process	B cell receptor signaling pathway; response to cytokine; response to estradiol; response to interleukin-1; response to hypoxia; response to retinoic acid; positive regulation of cytosolic calcium ion concentration; response to progesterone; female pregnancy; negative regulation of apoptotic process; response to hydroperoxide; positive regulation of transcription, DNA-templated; positive regulation of cell growth; positive regulation of B cell proliferation; positive regulation of vasoconstriction; long-term depression; apoptotic signaling pathway; response to hormone; negative regulation of transcription, DNA-templated; signal transduction; positive regulation of insulin secretion; negative regulation of bone resorption; NAD metabolic process; positive regulation of cell population proliferation; negative regulation of neuron projection development; artery smooth muscle contraction
Sources:Amigo / QuickGO
Orthologs
Databases	NCBI: entry; OMA: entry
Species	Human	Mouse
Entrez	952	12494
Ensembl	ENSG00000004468	ENSMUSG00000029084
UniProt	P28907	P56528
RefSeq (mRNA)	NM_001775	NM_007646
RefSeq (protein)	NP_001766	NP_031672
Location (UCSC)	Chr 4: 15.78 – 15.85 Mb	Chr 5: 44.03 – 44.07 Mb
PubMed search
- Wikidata
View/Edit Human	View/Edit Mouse

CD38 (cluster of differentiation 38), also known as cyclic ADP ribose hydrolase, is a glycoprotein found on the surface of many immune cells (white blood cells), including CD4^{+}, CD8^{+}, B lymphocytes and natural killer cells. CD38 also functions in cell adhesion, signal transduction and calcium signaling.

In humans, the CD38 protein is encoded by the CD38 gene which is located on chromosome 4. CD38 is a paralog of CD157, which is also located on chromosome 4 (4p15) in humans.

== History ==
CD38 was first identified in 1980 as a surface marker (cluster of differentiation) of thymus cell lymphocytes. In 1992 it was additionally described as a surface marker on B cells, monocytes, and natural killer cells (NK cells). About the same time, CD38 was discovered to be not simply a marker of cell types, but an activator of B cells and T cells. In 1992 the enzymatic activity of CD38 was discovered, having the capacity to synthesize the calcium-releasing second messengers cyclic ADP-ribose (cADPR) and nicotinic acid adenine dinucleotide phosphate (NAADP).

== Tissue distribution ==
CD38 is most frequently found on plasma B cells, followed by natural killer cells, followed by B cells and T cells, and then followed by a variety of cell types.

== Function ==
CD38 can function either as a receptor or as an enzyme. As a receptor, CD38 can attach to CD31 on the surface of T cells, thereby activating those cells to produce a variety of cytokines. CD38 activation cooperates with TRPM2 channels to initiate physiological responses such as cell volume regulation.

CD38 is also a component of the B-cell co-receptor complex, where it associates with CD19. It plays an essential role in regulating B-cell receptor (BCR) signaling, thereby influencing B-cell activation upon antigenic recognition.

CD38 is a multifunctional enzyme that catalyzes the synthesis of ADP ribose (ADPR) (97%) and cyclic ADP-ribose (cADPR) (3%) from NAD+. CD38 is thought to be a major regulator of NAD+ levels, its NADase activity is much higher than its function as an ADP-rybosyl-cyclase: for every 100 molecules of NAD+ converted to ADP ribose it generates one molecule of cADPR. When nicotinic acid is present under acidic conditions, CD38 can hydrolyze nicotinamide adenine dinucleotide phosphate (NADP+) to NAADP.

These reaction products are essential for the regulation of intracellular Ca^{2+}. CD38 occurs not only as an ectoenzyme on cell outer surfaces, but also occurs on the inner surface of cell membranes, facing the cytosol performing the same enzymatic functions.

CD38 is believed to control or influence neurotransmitter release in the brain by producing cADPR. CD38 within the brain enables release of the affiliative neuropeptide oxytocin.

Like CD38, CD157 is a member of the ADP-ribosyl cyclase family of enzymes that catalyze the formation of cADPR from NAD+, although CD157 is a much weaker catalyst than CD38. The SARM1 enzyme also catalyzes the formation of cADPR from NAD+, but SARM1 elevates cADPR much more efficiently than CD38.

== Clinical significance ==
The loss of CD38 function is associated with impaired immune responses, metabolic disturbances, and behavioral modifications including social amnesia possibly related to autism.

CD31 on endothelial cells binds to the CD38 receptor on natural killer cells for those cells to attach to the endothelium. CD38 on leukocytes attaching to CD31 on endothelial cells allows for leukocyte binding to blood vessel walls, and the passage of leukocytes through blood vessel walls.

The cytokine interferon gamma and the Gram negative bacterial cell wall component lipopolysaccharide induce CD38 expression on macrophages. Interferon gamma strongly induces CD38 expression on monocytes. The cytokine tumor necrosis factor strongly induces CD38 on airway smooth muscle cells inducing cADPR-mediated Ca^{2+}, thereby increasing dysfunctional contractility resulting in asthma.

The CD38 protein is a marker of cell activation. It has been connected to HIV infection, leukemias, myelomas, solid tumors, type II diabetes mellitus and bone metabolism, as well as some genetically determined conditions.

CD38 increases airway contractility hyperresponsiveness, is increased in the lungs of asthmatic patients, and amplifies the inflammatory response of airway smooth muscle of those patients.

== Clinical application ==
CD38 inhibitors may be used as therapeutics for the treatment of asthma.

CD38 has been used as a prognostic marker in leukemia.

Daratumumab (Darzalex) which targets CD38 has been used in treating multiple myeloma.

The use of Daratumumab can interfere with pre-blood transfusion tests, as CD38 is weakly expressed on the surface of erythrocytes. Thus, a screening assay for irregular antibodies against red blood cell antigens or a direct immunoglobulin test can produce false-positive results. This can be sidelined by either pretreatment of the erythrocytes with dithiothreitol (DTT) or by using an anti-CD38 antibody neutralizing agent, e.g. DaraEx.

== Inhibitors ==
- Cassic acid (Rhein)
- CD38-IN-78c
- Chrysanthemin (Kuromanin)
- Compound 1ai
- Compound 1am
- Daratumumab
- Isatuximab
- Felzartamab (MOR202)
- Mezagitamab
- Erzotabart
- Lumrotatug
- Sanritatug
- Modakafusp Alfa/TAK-573
- Apigenin
- Luteolinidin
- MK-0159
- TNB-738

== Aging studies ==
A gradual increase in CD38 has been implicated in the decline of NAD+ with age. Treatment of old mice with a specific CD38 inhibitor, 78c, prevents age-related NAD+ decline. CD38 knockout mice have twice the levels of NAD+ and are resistant to age-associated NAD+ decline, with dramatically increased NAD+ levels in major organs (liver, muscle, brain, and heart). On the other hand, mice overexpressing CD38 exhibit reduced NAD+ and mitochondrial dysfunction.

Macrophages are believed to be primarily responsible for the age-related increase in CD38 expression and NAD+ decline. Cellular senescence of macrophages increases CD38 expression. Macrophages accumulate in visceral fat and other tissues with age, leading to chronic inflammation. The inflammatory transcription factor NF-κB and CD38 are mutually activating. Secretions from senescent cells induce high levels of expression of CD38 on macrophages, which becomes the major cause of NAD+ depletion with age.

Decline of NAD+ in the brain with age may be due to increased CD38 on astrocytes and microglia, leading to neuroinflammation and neurodegeneration.
