= BST1 =

Protein-coding gene in the species Homo sapiens

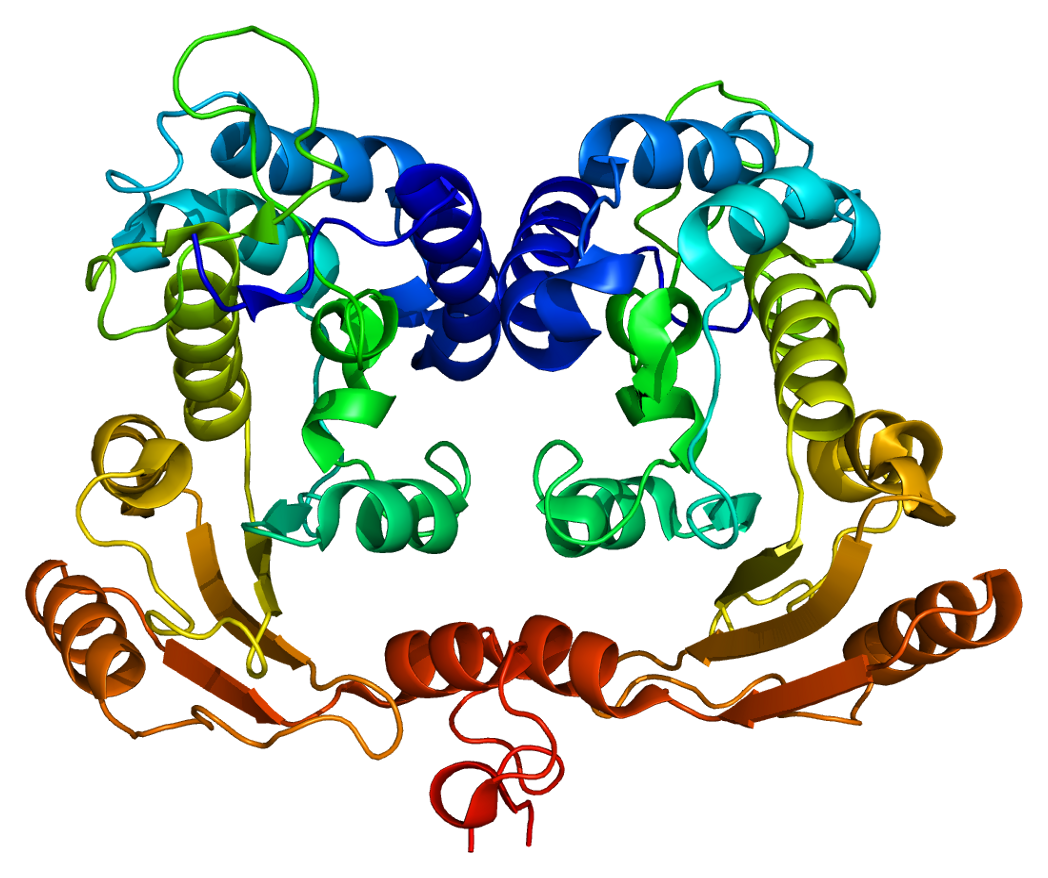

Identifiers
- Aliases: BST1, CD157, bone marrow stromal cell antigen 1
- External IDs: OMIM: 600387; MGI: 105370; GeneCards: BST1
Available structures
PDB	Ortholog search: PDBe RCSB
PDB	List of PDB id codes 1ISF, 1ISG, 1ISH, 1ISI, 1ISJ, 1ISM
Enzyme activity
EC #	BRENDA	ExPASy	KEGG	MetaCyc
3.2.2.6	↗	↗	↗	↗

Gene location (Human)
Chr.	Chromosome 4 (human)
Band	4p15.32	Start	15,703,065 bp
Band	4p15.32	End	15,738,313 bp

Gene location (Mouse)
Chr.	Chromosome 5 (mouse)
Band	5 B3|5 23.84 cM	Start	43,976,227 bp
Band	5 B3|5 23.84 cM	End	44,001,328 bp
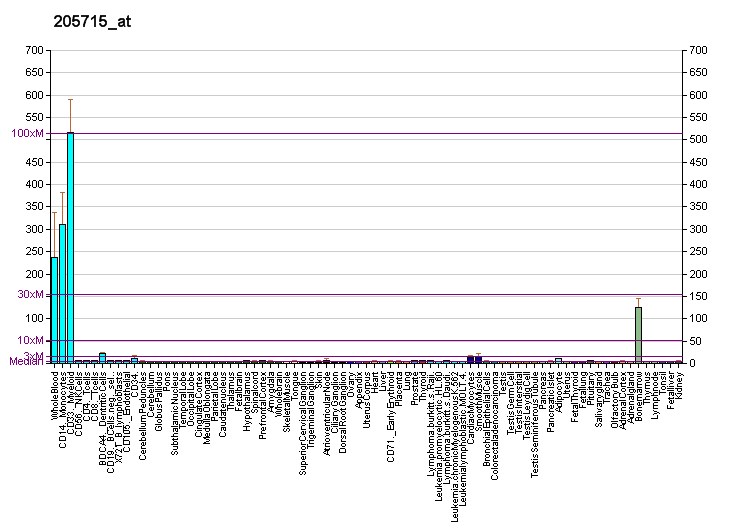
RNA expression pattern
Bgee	Human / Mouse (ortholog); Top expressed in: monocyte; granulocyte; bone marrow; blood; bone marrow cell; gonad; duodenum; gallbladder; stromal cell of endometrium; trabecular bone / Top expressed in: granulocyte; jejunum; stroma of bone marrow; duodenum; ileum; yolk sac; intestinal villus; epithelium of small intestine; neural layer of retina; blood; More reference expression data
BioGPS	More reference expression data
Gene ontology
Molecular function	NAD(P)+ nucleosidase activity; transferase activity; hydrolase activity; NAD+ nucleotidase, cyclic ADP-ribose generating; ADP-ribosyl cyclase activity; cyclic ADP-ribose hydrolase; NAD+ nucleosidase activity; phosphorus-oxygen lyase activity
Cellular component	anchored component of membrane; extracellular exosome; membrane; uropod; extracellular region; integrin complex; extrinsic component of membrane; specific granule membrane; plasma membrane
Biological process	regulation of cell-matrix adhesion; regulation of cellular extravasation; C-terminal protein lipidation; humoral immune response; signal transduction; positive regulation of cell population proliferation; NAD metabolic process; regulation of actin cytoskeleton organization; neutrophil degranulation; regulation of inflammatory response; regulation of peptidyl-tyrosine phosphorylation; regulation of calcium-mediated signaling; regulation of neutrophil chemotaxis; regulation of superoxide metabolic process; regulation of integrin-mediated signaling pathway; positive regulation of B cell proliferation
Sources:Amigo / QuickGO
Orthologs
Databases	NCBI: entry; OMA: entry
Species	Human	Mouse
Entrez	683	12182
Ensembl	ENSG00000109743	ENSMUSG00000029082
UniProt	Q10588	Q64277
RefSeq (mRNA)	NM_004334	NM_009763
RefSeq (protein)	NP_004325	NP_033893
Location (UCSC)	Chr 4: 15.7 – 15.74 Mb	Chr 5: 43.98 – 44 Mb
PubMed search
- Wikidata
View/Edit Human	View/Edit Mouse

Bst1 (Bone marrow stromal cell antigen 1, ADP-ribosyl cyclase 2, CD157) is an enzyme that in humans is encoded by the BST1 gene. CD157 is a paralog of CD38, both of which are located on chromosome 4 (4p15) in humans.

Bst1 is a stromal cell line-derived glycosylphosphatidylinositol-anchored molecule that facilitates pre-B-cell growth. The deduced amino acid sequence exhibits 33% similarity with CD38. BST1 expression is enhanced in bone marrow stromal cell lines derived from patients with rheumatoid arthritis. The polyclonal B-cell abnormalities in rheumatoid arthritis may be, at least in part, attributed to BST1 overexpression in the stromal cell population.

CD157 and CD38 are both members of the ADP-ribosyl cyclase family of enzymes that catalyze the formation of nicotinamide and adenosine diphosphate ribose (ADPR) or cyclic ADP-ribose (cADPR) from NAD+, although CD157 is a much weaker catalyst than CD38. cADPR is required for regulation of Ca^{2+} in cells. Only CD38 hydrolyzed cADPR to ADPR. CD38 is widely expressed in tissues, whereas CD157 is primarily found in gut and lymphoid tissue.

CD157 has an important role in controlling the migration of leukocytes, the adhesion of leukocytes to blood vessel walls, and the passage of leukocytes through blood vessel walls.

CD157 contributes to macrophage killing of the Mycobacterium tuberculosis bacteria responsible for tuberculosis.

CD157 is highly expressed in acute myeloid leukemia, and is being evaluated as a diagnostic sign, as a treatment target, and as a means of monitoring treatment progress.

BST1 and BST2 genes are unregulated by the Nicotinamide (NAM) metabolism pathway.

== See also ==
- Cluster of differentiation
