= Adenosine diphosphate ribose =

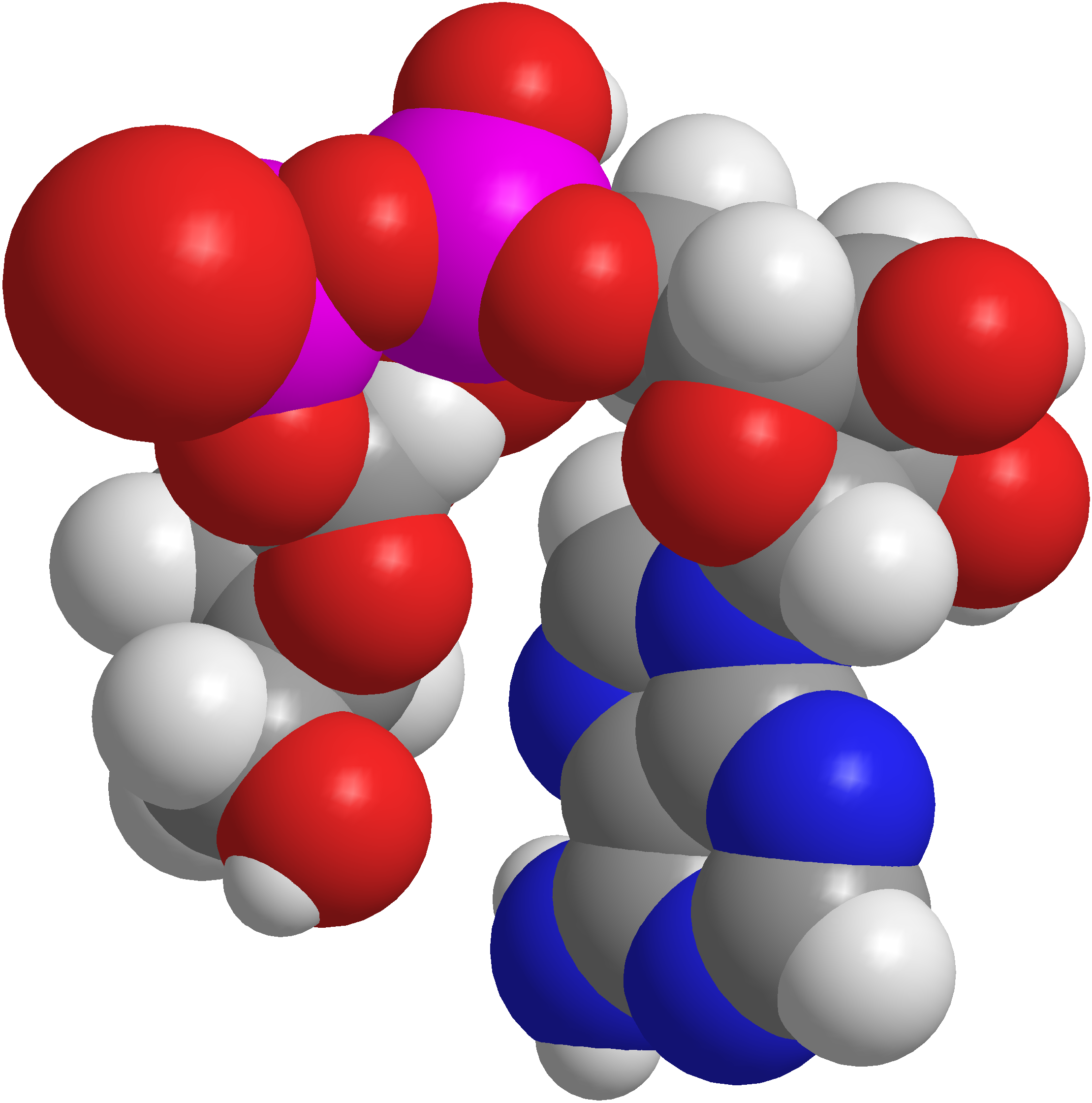

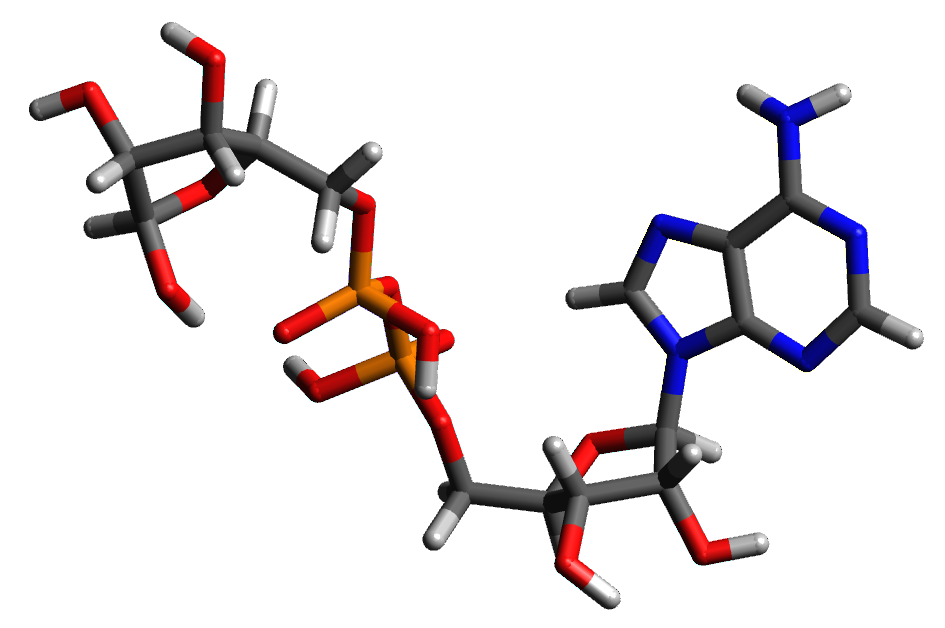

Names
- Other names ADP ribose ADPR; Adenosine 5'-diphosphoribose

Identifiers
CAS Number	20762-30-5
3D model (JSmol)	Interactive image
ChEMBL	ChEMBL1161865
ChemSpider	388340
MeSH	Adenosine+Diphosphate+Ribose
PubChem CID	439200
UNII	XV3S4KV26E
- InChI: InChI=1S/C15H23N5O14P2/c16-12-7-13(18-3-17-12)20(4-19-7)14-10(24)9(23)6(31-14)2-30-35(26,27)34-36(28,29)33-15-11(25)8(22)5(1-21)32-15/h3-6,8-11,14-15,21-25H,1-2H2,(H4,16,17,18,26,27,28,29)/p+1/t5-,6+,8-,9+,10+,11-,14+,15+/m0/s1 Key: YNCNQNWXUFCWJS-DKMYFHGXSA-O; InChI=1/C15H23N5O14P2/c16-12-7-13(18-3-17-12)20(4-19-7)14-10(24)9(23)6(31-14)2-30-35(26,27)34-36(28,29)33-15-11(25)8(22)5(1-21)32-15/h3-6,8-11,14-15,21-25H,1-2H2,(H4,16,17,18,26,27,28,29)/p+1/t5-,6+,8-,9+,10+,11-,14+,15+/m0/s1 Key: YNCNQNWXUFCWJS-LKOYDKQFBH
- SMILES: O=P(O[C@H]1O[C@H]([C@H](O)[C@@H]1O)CO)(O)OP(=O)(OC[C@H]4O[C@@H](n3c2ncnc(N)c2nc3)[C@H](O)[C@@H]4O)O

Properties
Chemical formula	C_{15}H_{23}N_{5}O_{14}P_{2}
Molar mass	559.316 g/mol
- Except where otherwise noted, data are given for materials in their standard state (at 25 °C [77 °F], 100 kPa). verify (what is ?) Infobox references

Adenosine diphosphate ribose (ADPR) is an ester molecule formed into chains by the enzyme poly ADP ribose polymerase. ADPR is created from cyclic ADP-ribose (cADPR) by the CD38 enzyme using nicotinamide adenine dinucleotide (NAD^{+}) as a cofactor.

ADPR binds to and activates the TRPM2 ion channel. ADPR is the most potent agonist of the TRPM2 channel. cADPR also binds to TPRM2, and the action of both molecules is synergistic, with both molecules enhancing the action of the other molecule in activating the TRPM2 channel. Researchers are not sure how the Adenosine diphosphate reacts with the TRPM2 channel, but the ribose sugar may play a role in activating the TRPM2 ion channel.

Researchers believe that co-targeting DNA-dependent protein kinase and poly(adenosine diphosphate-ribose) polymerase-1 does not promote apoptosis or mitotic catastrophe of cancer cells after radiation.

== See also ==
- Adenosine diphosphate
- ADP-ribosylation
- Ribose
- Poly (ADP-ribose) polymerase
