= COA6 =

Protein-coding gene in humans

Identifiers
- Aliases: COA6, C1orf31, CEMCOX4, cytochrome c oxidase assembly factor 6, MC4DN13
- External IDs: OMIM: 614772; MGI: 1915142; GeneCards: COA6

Gene location (Human)
Chr.	Chromosome 1 (human)
Band	1q42.2	Start	234,373,456 bp
Band	1q42.2	End	234,385,080 bp

Gene location (Mouse)
Chr.	Chromosome 8 (mouse)
Band	8|8 E2	Start	127,149,254 bp
Band	8|8 E2	End	127,152,172 bp
RNA expression pattern
Bgee	Human / Mouse (ortholog); Top expressed in: myocardium of left ventricle; gastrocnemius muscle; putamen; deltoid muscle; caudate nucleus; quadriceps femoris muscle; vastus lateralis muscle; nucleus accumbens; Brodmann area 9; mucosa of transverse colon / Top expressed in: atrioventricular valve; endocardial cushion; right kidney; proximal tubule; epithelium of lens; medullary collecting duct; human kidney; intercostal muscle; left lobe of liver; fossa; More reference expression data
BioGPS	n/a
Gene ontology
Molecular function	copper ion binding; protein binding; RNA binding
Cellular component	mitochondrial intermembrane space; mitochondrion; plasma membrane
Biological process	plasma membrane ATP synthesis coupled electron transport; respiratory chain complex IV assembly
Sources:Amigo / QuickGO
Orthologs
Databases	NCBI: entry; OMA: entry
Species	Human	Mouse
Entrez	388753	67892
Ensembl	ENSG00000168275	ENSMUSG00000051671
UniProt	Q5JTJ3	Q8BGD8
RefSeq (mRNA)	NM_001301733; NM_001012985; NM_001206641	NM_174987
RefSeq (protein)	NP_001013003; NP_001193570; NP_001288662	NP_778152
Location (UCSC)	Chr 1: 234.37 – 234.39 Mb	Chr 8: 127.15 – 127.15 Mb
PubMed search
- Wikidata
View/Edit Human	View/Edit Mouse

Cytochrome c oxidase assembly factor 6 is a protein that in humans is encoded by the COA6 gene. Mitochondrial respiratory chain Complex IV, or cytochrome c oxidase, is the component of the respiratory chain that catalyzes the transfer of electrons from intermembrane space cytochrome c to molecular oxygen in the matrix and as a consequence contributes to the proton gradient involved in mitochondrial ATP synthesis. The COA6 gene encodes an assembly factor for mitochondrial complex IV and is a member of the cytochrome c oxidase subunit 6B family. This protein is located in the intermembrane space, associating with SCO2 and COX2. It stabilizes newly formed COX2 and is part of the mitochondrial copper relay system. Mutations in this gene result in fatal infantile cardioencephalomyopathy.

== Structure ==
The COA6 gene is located on the q arm of chromosome 1 in position 42.2 and spans 10,612 base pairs. The gene produces a 14.1 kDa protein composed of 125 amino acids. The COA6 protein is found a complex with TMEM177, COX20, MT-CO_{2}/COX2, COX18, SCO1 and SCO2. The protein has a CX9CXnCX10C motif and a CHCH domain, which hints that the protein is most likely a redox protein rather than a copper metallochaperone.

== Function ==
The COA6 encodes a protein which is an assembly factor for Complex IV. This protein is specifically required for COX2 biogenesis and stability; the absence of this protein will cause fast turnover of newly synthesized COX2.The presence of a CHCH domain facilitates its function as a thiol-disulfide reductant as it facilitates the transfer of copper from SCO1 to COX2.

== Clinical significance ==
Two mutations have been identified in this protein: W66R and W59C. The latter mutation results in the protein being mistargeted to the mitochondrial matrix, resulting in the loss of interaction with SCO2 and COX2. Inheritance of this mutation is autosomal recessive and results in a phenotype of fatal infantile cardioencephalomyopathy due to Complex IV deficiency. Symptoms include hypertrophic cardiomyopathy, left ventricular non-compaction, lactic acidosis, and metabolic hypotonia.

== Interactions ==
This protein interacts transiently with the copper-containing catalytic domain of newly synthesized COX2 via its C-terminal tail exposed to the intermembrane space. It also interacts selectively with the copper metallochaperone SCO2 in a COX2-dependent manner and with COX20 in a COX2- and COX18-dependent manner. Additionally, this protein interacts with COA1, SCO1, COX16, TTC19, DTX2, NADSYN1, GABARAP, AIFM1, COX4I1, CD81, COX14, SFXN1, and PLGRKT.
