= MROH6 =

Human protein

Identifiers
- Aliases: MROH6, C8orf73, maestro heat like repeat family member 6
- External IDs: MGI: 5011755; GeneCards: MROH6

Gene location (Human)
Chr.	Chromosome 8 (human)
Band	8q24.3	Start	143,566,192 bp
Band	8q24.3	End	143,572,772 bp

Gene location (Mouse)
Chr.	Chromosome 15 (mouse)
Band	15|15 D3	Start	75,755,986 bp
Band	15|15 D3	End	75,760,619 bp
RNA expression pattern
Bgee	Human / Mouse (ortholog); Top expressed in: mucosa of transverse colon; skin of leg; testicle; skin of abdomen; bone marrow; blood; bone marrow cell; vagina; right lobe of liver; right hemisphere of cerebellum / Top expressed in: esophagus; lip; zone of skin; jejunum; bone marrow; duodenum; stomach; granulocyte; ileum; colon; More reference expression data
BioGPS	n/a
Orthologs
Databases	NCBI: entry; OMA: entry
Species	Human	Mouse
Entrez	642475	223645
Ensembl	ENSG00000204839; ENSG00000277781	ENSMUSG00000098678
UniProt	A6NGR9	V9GX81
RefSeq (mRNA)	NM_001100878	NM_001282443
RefSeq (protein)	NP_001094348	NP_001269372
Location (UCSC)	Chr 8: 143.57 – 143.57 Mb	Chr 15: 75.76 – 75.76 Mb
PubMed search
- Wikidata
View/Edit Human	View/Edit Mouse

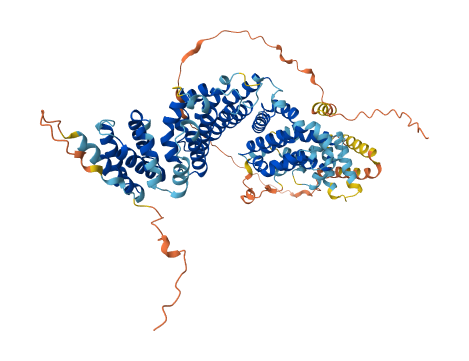
Predicted tertiary protein structure of Maestro Heat-Like Repeat Family Member 6, generated by the program Alphafold

MAESTRO heat-like repeat family member 6 (MROH6) is a protein which in humans is encoded by the MROH6 gene (previously C8orf73). The word 'maestro' itself is an acronym, standing for Male-Specific Transcription in the Developing Reproductive Organs (MRO). MRO genes belong to the MROH family, which includes MROH1, MROH2B, MROH7, MROH8, and MROH9.

== Gene ==
The genomic location of MROH6 in humans is on chromosome 8 (8q24.3), spanning 6,581 base pairs, from base pair 143,566,192 to 143,572,772. The gene contains a total of 15 exons.

== Transcript ==
The MROH6 gene encodes 17 known mRNA transcript variants. The longest transcript variant is simply referred to as MROH6, which is 3,265 nucleotides long and contains 14 exons.

Table 1: MROH6 isoforms.
Transcript variant number	Accession number	Span in nucleotides	Aligned length in nucleotides	Exons used
MROH6	NM_001100878.2	6,581	3,265	14
X1	XM_011517214.2	6,581	2,641	14
X2	XM_011517215.2	6,581	2,638	14
X3	XM_011517216.3	6,581	2,573	13
X4	XM_011517217.2	6,581	2,507	12
X5	XM_011517220.2	4,974	2,223	11
X6	XM_011517221.3	6,334	2,159	15
X7	XM_047422089.1	6,334	2,156	15
X8	XM_011517222.2	6,581	2,338	14
X9	XM_047422090.1	6,333	2,140	15
X10	XM_047422092.1	6,581	2,317	14
X11	XM_011517223.2	6,581	2,272	13
X12	XM_047422093.1	6,581	2,269	14
X13	XM_047422094.1	6,581	2,254	13
X14	XM_047422095.1	6,581	2,251	13
X15	XM_047422096.1	6,581	2,197	13
X16	XM_006716615.3	4,987	2,263	11
X17	XM_047422097.1	4,987	2,260	11

== Protein ==
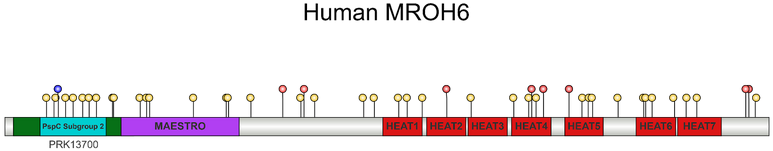
Diagram of the human MROH6 protein showcasing domains/motifs and post-translational modification sites.

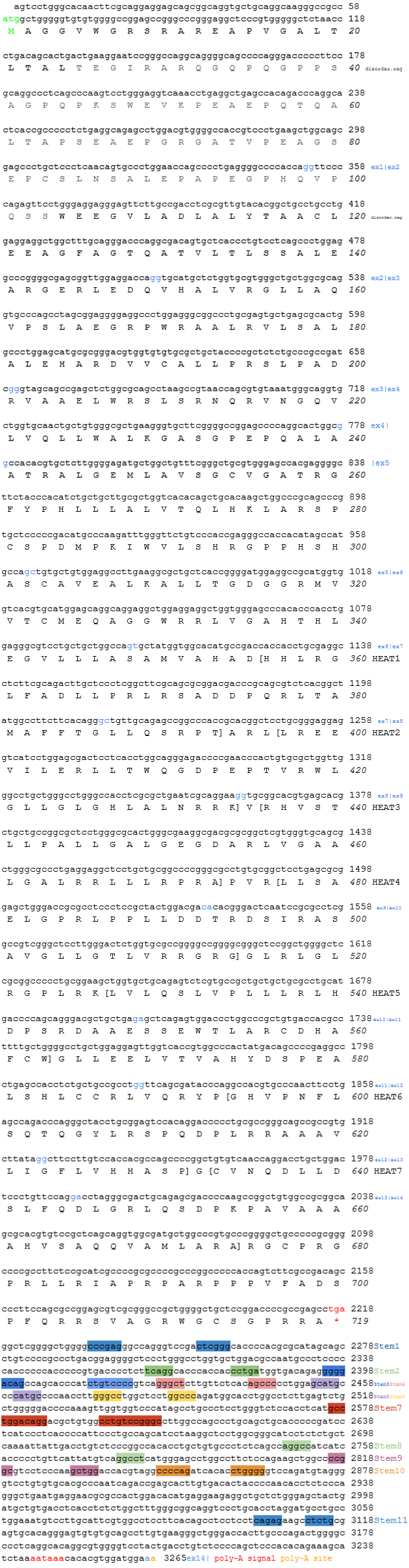
Conceptual translation of the MROH6 protein in humans

The protein encoded by the primary isoform of MROH6 is 719 amino acids long.

=== Domains ===
A notable feature of the MROH6 protein is the presence of seven HEAT repeats, which are protein tandem repeat structural motifs. HEAT repeats are composed of two alpha helices linked by a short loop. These repeats give MROH6 and its gene family its name, as well as directing the function of the protein.

=== Structure ===
MROH6 consists primarily of alpha helices. The protein structure lacks any beta sheets.

== Regulation ==
=== Gene level ===
MROH6 demonstrates broad expression throughout the human body. However, it shows noticeably higher expression in certain tissues, such as the esophagus. In human fetal development, high expression is shown in the stomach, lung, intestine, and adrenal gland. RNA sequencing data also shows high expression in the cerebellum, liver, lung, placenta, small intestine, and stomach. The Human Protein Atlas indicates high expression in the bone marrow, esophagus, skin, and stomach.

=== Protein level ===
The protein is predicted to be localized within the cytoplasm, nucleus, and mitochondria.

== Evolution ==
=== Orthologs ===
Orthologs of the MROH6 protein were found to exist in amniotes as well as the genome of Amia calva. Despite the presence of the gene in Amia calva, orthologs of MROH6 have not been found in any other fish nor in amphibians.

Table 2: MROH6 orthologs and related properties.
Scientific name	Common name	Taxon	median date of divergence (MYA)	Accession #	Length (amino acids)	% identity to humans	% similarity to humans
Homo Sapiens	Humans	Primates	0.0	NP_001094348.1	719	100.0%	100.0%
Theropithecus gelada	Gelada	Primates	28.8	XP_025250353.1	717	95.5%	96.9%
Mus musculus	House mouse	Rodentia	87.0	NP_001269372.1	722	79.8%	85.6%
Ursus maritimus	Polar bear	Carnivora	94.0	XP_040481956.1	705	79.5%	84.4%
Bos taurus	Common cattle	Artiodactyl	94.0	XP_002692603.1	711	79.8%	84.6%
Manis javanica	Malayan pangolin	Pholidota	94.0	KAI5929482.1	691	74.2%	80.2%
Elephas maximus indicus	Indian elephant	Elephantidae	99.0	XP_049709696.1	717	80.8%	85.8%
Sarcophilus harrisii	Tasmanian devil	Marsupialia	160.0	XP_031803182.1	735	57.9%	66.7%
Ornithorhynchus anatinus	Platypus	Monotremes	180.0	XP_039767867.1	832	51.3%	58.9%
Gallus gallus	Red junglefowl	Galliformes	319.0	XP_040537654.1	651	23.8%	37.7%
Anas platyrhynchos	Mallard	Anseriformes	319.0	XP_071898069.1	736	20.4%	32.6%
Falco naumanni	Lesser kestrel	Falconiformes	319.0	XP_040449421.1	583	20.7%	32.7%
Patagioenas fasciata	Band-tailed pigeon	Columbiformes	319.0	XP_071666853.1	857	22.7%	33.6%
Colius striatus	Speckled mousebird	Coliiformes	319.0	XP_061870785.1	581	22.0%	32.9%
Candoia aspera	Papuan ground boa	Serpentes	319.0	XP_063156074.1	775	33.2%	47.0%
Tiliqua scincoides	Common blue-tongued skink	Scincidae	319.0	XP_066477445.1	734	24.3%	37.4%
Chelonia mydas	Green sea turtle	Cryptodira	319.0	XP_027683785.3	885	32.0%	42.4%
Emydura macquarii macquarii	Macquarie River turtle	Pleurodira	319.0	XP_067392966.1	372	19.2%	27.3%
Crocodylus porosus	Saltwater crocodile	Crocodilians	319.0	XP_019406236.1	169	6.4%	9.6%
Amia calva	Ruddy bowfin	Actinopterygii	429.0	XP_066543890.1	168	7.2%	10.9%

=== Paralogs ===
MROH6 has multiple paralogs found in the human genome and is a member of the MROH family, consisting of seven other genes, as well as three pseudogenes.

Table 3: Paralogs of the human MROH6 gene.
Paralog	Accession #	Length (amino acids)	Percent identity to MROH6	Percent similarity to MROH6
MRO	NP_114145	248	7.9%	12.5%
MROH1	NP_115826.3	1,641	12.0%	16.9%
MROH2A	NP_001381568.1	1,674	10.2%	17.0%
MROH2B	NP_775760.3	1,585	10.3%	17.0%
MROH7	NP_001034553.3	1,323	16.0%	23.7%
MROH8	NP_689716.4	1,052	15.8%	27.0%
MROH9	NP_001157101.1	861	18.3%	31.1%

== Interacting proteins ==
The MROH6 protein has been shown and predicted to interact with a wide variety of proteins with a wide variety of functions and localization. These include NUDT15, XPO1, NMNAT1, NMNAT2, NMNAT3, NAPRT, FTL, IQGAP1, SMCO3, NADSYN1, and FAAH.

== Clinical significance ==
Little research has been done into MROH6. MROH6 has been identified as a possible contributor to neuroblastoma, with high expression of the protein leading to poor prognosis. Other studies have identified changes in MROH6 expression as a possible contributor to male infertility, changes in interleukin-18 levels, and gestational diabetes mellitus.
