= COX20 =

Protein-coding gene in humans

Identifiers
- Aliases: COX20, FAM36A, COX20 cytochrome c oxidase assembly factor, cytochrome c oxidase assembly factor, cytochrome c oxidase assembly factor MC4DN11
- External IDs: OMIM: 614698; MGI: 1913609; GeneCards: COX20

Gene location (Human)
Chr.	Chromosome 1 (human)
Band	1q44	Start	244,835,616 bp
Band	1q44	End	244,845,057 bp

Gene location (Mouse)
Chr.	Chromosome 1 (mouse)
Band	1|1 H4	Start	178,146,695 bp
Band	1|1 H4	End	178,150,258 bp
RNA expression pattern
Bgee	Human / Mouse (ortholog); Top expressed in: endothelial cell; pancreatic epithelial cell; right auricle of heart; renal medulla; ganglionic eminence; retinal pigment epithelium; left ventricle; nucleus accumbens; popliteal artery; tibial arteries / Top expressed in: proximal tubule; lens; right kidney; heart; thymus; foregut; stomach; adrenal gland; ileum; white adipose tissue; More reference expression data
BioGPS	n/a
Gene ontology
Molecular function	protein binding
Cellular component	integral component of membrane; mitochondrion; membrane; mitochondrial inner membrane
Biological process	aerobic dissimilation; mitochondrial cytochrome c oxidase assembly
Sources:Amigo / QuickGO
Orthologs
Databases	NCBI: entry; OMA: entry
Species	Human	Mouse
Entrez	116228	66359
Ensembl	ENSG00000203667	ENSMUSG00000026500
UniProt	Q5RI15	Q9D7J4
RefSeq (mRNA)	NM_001312871; NM_001312872; NM_001312873; NM_001312874; NM_198076	NM_025511
RefSeq (protein)	NP_001299800; NP_001299801; NP_001299802; NP_001299803; NP_932342	NP_079787
Location (UCSC)	Chr 1: 244.84 – 244.85 Mb	Chr 1: 178.15 – 178.15 Mb
PubMed search
- Wikidata
View/Edit Human	View/Edit Mouse

Cytochrome c oxidase assembly factor COX20 is a protein that in humans is encoded by the COX20 gene. This gene encodes a protein that plays a role in the assembly of cytochrome c oxidase, an important component of the respiratory pathway. Mutations in this gene can cause mitochondrial complex IV deficiency. There are multiple pseudogenes for this gene. Alternative splicing results in multiple transcript variants.

== Structure ==
The COX20 gene is located on the q arm of chromosome 1 at position 44 and it spans 9,757 base pairs. The COX20 gene produces a 13.3 kDa protein composed of 118 amino acids. It contains two transmembrane helices and localizes to the mitochondrial membrane.

== Function ==
The COX20 gene encodes for a protein required for the assembly of cytochrome c oxidase (complex IV). Complex IV is the terminal complex of the mitochondrial respiratory chain which is required for catalyzing the oxidation of cytochrome c by molecular oxygen. COX20 is known to act as a chaperone protein during the early stages of COX2 (cytochrome c oxidase subunit II) maturation which leads to the stabilization of the protein. By presenting COX2 to the metallochaperones SCO1 and SCO2, they help facilitate the incorporation of the mature COX2 into the complex IV holoenzyme assembly. However, it has been known that COX20 has no influence on transcription or translation of COX2 or any other genes. The knockdown of the protein COX20 has been shown to result in reduced respiratory capacity and the accumulation of respiratory chain intermediates.

== Clinical significance ==
Variants of COX20 have been associated with the mitochondrial Complex IV deficiency, a deficiency in an enzyme complex of the mitochondrial respiratory chain which catalyzes the oxidation of cytochrome c utilizing molecular oxygen. The deficiency is characterized by heterogeneous phenotypes ranging from isolated myopathy to severe multisystem disease affecting several tissues and organs. Other Clinical Manifestations include hypertrophic cardiomyopathy, hepatomegaly and liver dysfunction, hypotonia, muscle weakness, exercise intolerance, developmental delay, delayed motor development and intellectual disability. A homozygous mutation of c.154A-C in the COX20 gene has been found to result in reduced COX20, cytochrome c oxidase, and decreased activity. Other mutations have included a homozygous T52P.

== Interactions ==
COX20 has co-complex interactions with proteins such as TMEM177, COX2, SCO1, COA6, and others in a COX2 and COX18 dependent manner.
