= SCO1 =

Protein-coding gene in humans

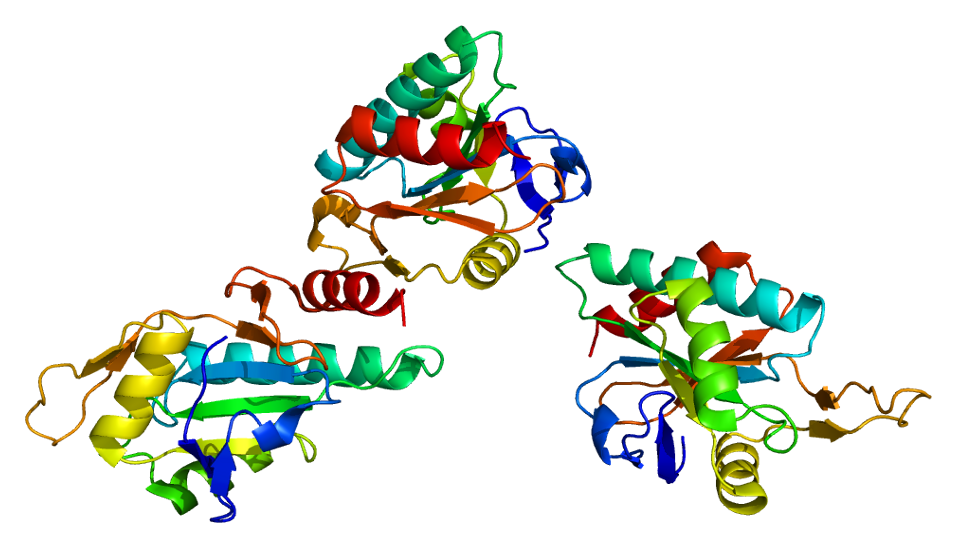
Available structures
PDB	Ortholog search: PDBe RCSB
PDB	List of PDB id codes 1WP0, 2GGT, 2GQK, 2GQL, 2GQM, 2GT5, 2GT6, 2GVP, 2HRF, 2HRN

Identifiers
- Aliases: SCO1, SCOD1, SCO1 cytochrome c oxidase assembly protein, cytochrome c oxidase assembly protein, SCO cytochrome c oxidase assembly protein 1, synthesis of cytochrome C oxidase 1, MC4DN4
- External IDs: OMIM: 603644; MGI: 106362; HomoloGene: 3374; GeneCards: SCO1; OMA:SCO1 - orthologs

Gene location (Human)
Chr.	Chromosome 17 (human)
Band	17p13.1	Start	10,672,474 bp
Band	17p13.1	End	10,698,375 bp

Gene location (Mouse)
Chr.	Chromosome 11 (mouse)
Band	11 B3|11 40.59 cM	Start	66,943,496 bp
Band	11 B3|11 40.59 cM	End	66,957,896 bp
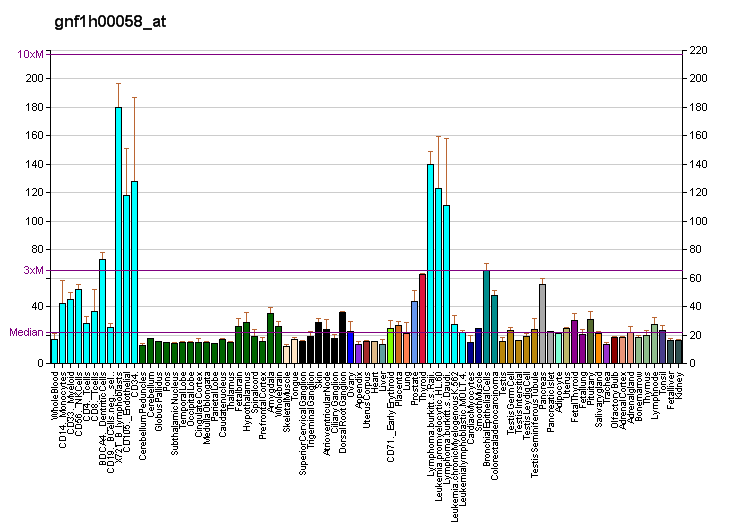
RNA expression pattern
Bgee	Human / Mouse (ortholog); Top expressed in: myocardium of left ventricle; gonad; mucosa of transverse colon; cardiac muscle tissue of right atrium; mucosa of ileum; tibialis anterior muscle; Achilles tendon; gastrocnemius muscle; right lobe of liver; right adrenal cortex / Top expressed in: interventricular septum; jejunum; Paneth cell; right kidney; duodenum; embryo; embryo; ventricular zone; yolk sac; proximal tubule; More reference expression data
BioGPS	More reference expression data
Gene ontology
Molecular function	protein binding; copper ion binding; metal ion binding
Cellular component	myofibril; host cell mitochondrial intermembrane space; mitochondrion; mitochondrial inner membrane; integral component of mitochondrial inner membrane; membrane; integral component of membrane
Biological process	cellular copper ion homeostasis; generation of precursor metabolites and energy; copper ion transport; respiratory chain complex IV assembly; negative regulation of proteasomal protein catabolic process; mitochondrial cytochrome c oxidase assembly
Sources:Amigo / QuickGO
Orthologs
Species	Human	Mouse
Entrez	6341	52892
Ensembl	ENSG00000133028	ENSMUSG00000069844
UniProt	O75880	Q5SUC9
RefSeq (mRNA)	NM_004589	NM_001040026
RefSeq (protein)	NP_004580	NP_001035115
Location (UCSC)	Chr 17: 10.67 – 10.7 Mb	Chr 11: 66.94 – 66.96 Mb
PubMed search
- Wikidata
View/Edit Human	View/Edit Mouse

Protein SCO1 homolog, mitochondrial, also known as SCO1, cytochrome c oxidase assembly protein, is a protein that in humans is encoded by the SCO1 gene. SCO1 localizes predominantly to blood vessels, whereas SCO2 is barely detectable, as well as to tissues with high levels of oxidative phosphorylation. The expression of SCO2 is also much higher than that of SCO1 in muscle tissue, while SCO1 is expressed at higher levels in liver tissue than SCO2. Mutations in both SCO1 and SCO2 are associated with distinct clinical phenotypes as well as tissue-specific cytochrome c oxidase (complex IV) deficiency.

== Structure ==
SCO1 is located on the p arm of chromosome 17 in position 13.1 and has 6 exons. The SCO1 gene produces a 33.8 kDa protein composed of 301 amino acids. The protein is a member of the SCO1/2 family. It contains 3 copper metal binding sites at positions 169, 173, and 260, a transit peptide, a 25 amino acid topological domain from positions 68–92, a 19 amino acid helical transmembrane domain from positions 93–111, and a 190 amino acid topological domain from positions 112–301 in the mitochondrial intermembrane. Additionally, SCO1 has been predicted to contain 10 beta-strands, 7 helixes, and 2 turns and is a single-pass membrane protein.

== Function ==
Mammalian cytochrome c oxidase (COX) catalyzes the transfer of reducing equivalents from cytochrome c to molecular oxygen and pumps protons across the inner mitochondrial membrane. In yeast, 2 related COX assembly genes, SCO1 and SCO2 (synthesis of cytochrome c oxidase), enable subunits 1 and 2 to be incorporated into the holoprotein. This gene is the human homolog to the yeast SCO1 gene. It is predominantly expressed in muscle, heart, and brain tissues, which are also known for their high rates of oxidative phosphorylation. SCO1 is a copper metallochaperone that is located in the inner mitochondrial membrane and is important for the maturation and stabilization of cytochrome c oxidase subunit II (MT-CO2/COX2). It plays a role in the regulation of copper homeostasis by controlling the localization and abundance of CTR1 and is responsible for the transportation of copper to the Cu(A) site on MT-CO2/COX2.

== Clinical relevance ==
Mutations in the SCO1 gene are associated with hepatic failure and encephalopathy resulting from mitochondrial complex IV deficiency also known as cytochrome c oxidase deficiency. This is a disorder of the mitochondrial respiratory chain with heterogeneous clinical manifestations, ranging from isolated myopathy to severe multisystem disease affecting several tissues and organs. Features include hypertrophic cardiomyopathy, hepatomegaly, and liver dysfunction, hypotonia, muscle weakness, exercise intolerance, developmental delay, delayed motor development, mental retardation, and lactic acidosis. Some affected individuals manifest fatal hypertrophic cardiomyopathy resulting in neonatal death. A subset of patients also suffers from Leigh syndrome. Specifically, cases of pathogenic SCO1 mutations have resulted in fatal infantile encephalopathy, neonatal-onset hepatic failure, and severe hepatopathy. The P174L and M294V mutations have been identified and implicated in these diseases and phenotypes. It has also been suggested that mutations in SCO1, as well as SCO2, can result in a cellular copper deficiency, which can occur separately from cytochrome c oxidase assembly defects.

== Interactions ==
SCO1 has been shown to have 127 binary protein–protein interactions including 120 co-complex interactions. SCO1 interacts with COA6, TMEM177, COX20, COX16, COX17, WDR19, CIDEB, and UBC7. It is also found in a complex with TMEM177, COX20, COA6, MT-CO2/COX2, COX18, and SCO2.
