= NMNAT1 =

Protein found in humans

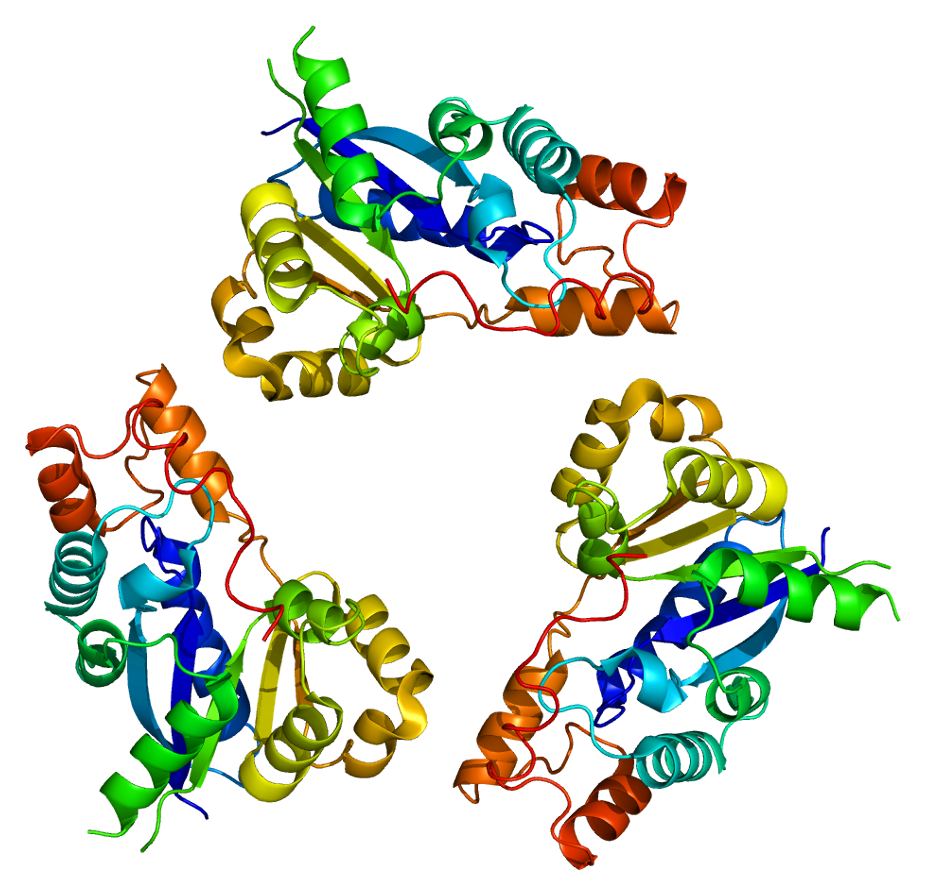

Identifiers
- Aliases: NMNAT1, LCA9, NMNAT, PNAT1, nicotinamide nucleotide adenylyltransferase 1, SHILCA
- External IDs: OMIM: 608700; MGI: 1913704; GeneCards: NMNAT1
Available structures
PDB	Ortholog search: PDBe RCSB
PDB	List of PDB id codes 1GZU, 1KKU, 1KQN, 1KQO, 1KR2
Enzyme activity
EC #	BRENDA	ExPASy	KEGG	MetaCyc
2.7.7.1	↗	↗	↗	↗
2.7.7.18	↗	↗	↗	↗

Gene location (Human)
Chr.	Chromosome 1 (human)
Band	1p36.22	Start	9,943,428 bp
Band	1p36.22	End	9,985,501 bp

Gene location (Mouse)
Chr.	Chromosome 4 (mouse)
Band	4|4 E2	Start	149,552,029 bp
Band	4|4 E2	End	149,569,659 bp
RNA expression pattern
Bgee	Human / Mouse (ortholog); Top expressed in: muscle of thigh; mucosa of transverse colon; testicle; gastrocnemius muscle; islet of Langerhans; monocyte; Achilles tendon; stromal cell of endometrium; rectum; apex of heart / Top expressed in: otic placode; otic vesicle; saccule; muscle of thigh; right kidney; quadriceps femoris muscle; tibialis anterior muscle; skeletal muscle tissue; embryo; intercostal muscle; More reference expression data
BioGPS	n/a
Gene ontology
Molecular function	transferase activity; nucleotide binding; nucleotidyltransferase activity; protein binding; ATP binding; catalytic activity; nicotinamide-nucleotide adenylyltransferase activity; nicotinate-nucleotide adenylyltransferase activity; identical protein binding
Cellular component	nucleus; nucleoplasm; nuclear body; cytoplasm
Biological process	pyridine nucleotide biosynthetic process; NAD metabolic process; NAD biosynthetic process; biosynthesis; 'de novo' NAD biosynthetic process from aspartate; response to wounding; ATP generation from poly-ADP-D-ribose; positive regulation of MAPK cascade; negative regulation of neuron apoptotic process; negative regulation of apoptotic DNA fragmentation; nucleotide biosynthetic process
Sources:Amigo / QuickGO
Orthologs
Databases	NCBI: entry; OMA: entry
Species	Human	Mouse
Entrez	64802	66454
Ensembl	ENSG00000173614	ENSMUSG00000028992
UniProt	Q9HAN9	Q9EPA7
RefSeq (mRNA)	NM_001297778; NM_001297779; NM_022787	NM_133435; NM_001356357
RefSeq (protein)	NP_001284707; NP_001284708; NP_073624	NP_597679; NP_001343286
Location (UCSC)	Chr 1: 9.94 – 9.99 Mb	Chr 4: 149.55 – 149.57 Mb
PubMed search
- Wikidata
View/Edit Human	View/Edit Mouse

Nicotinamide mononucleotide adenylyltransferase 1 (NMNAT1) is an enzyme that in humans is encoded by the nmnat1 gene. It is a member of the nicotinamide-nucleotide adenylyltransferases (NMNATs) which catalyze nicotinamide adenine dinucleotide (NAD) synthesis.

== Function ==
The coenzyme NAD and its derivatives are involved in hundreds of metabolic redox reactions and are utilized in protein ADP-ribosylation, histone deacetylation, and in some Ca^{2+} signaling pathways. NMNAT (EC 2.7.7.1) is a central enzyme in NAD biosynthesis, catalyzing the condensation of nicotinamide mononucleotide (NMN) or nicotinic acid mononucleotide (NaMN) with the AMP moiety of ATP to form NAD or NaAD.

NMNAT1 is the most widely expressed of three orthologous genes with nicotinamide-nucleotide adenylyltransferase (NMNAT) activity. Genetically engineered mice lacking NMNAT1 die during early embryogenesis, indicating a critical role of this gene in organismal viability. In contrast, mice lacking NMNAT2, which is expressed predominantly in neural tissues, complete development but die shortly after birth. However, NMNAT1 is dispensable for cell viability, as homozygous deletion of this gene occurs in glioblastoma tumors and cell lines. Other tumors such as osteosarcoma, however, increase the expression of NMNAT1 upon exposure to DNA damaging agents and inactivation of the nmnat1 gene renders these cells more sensitive to chemotherapy with cisplatin. This latter effect involves lowered nuclear NAD levels in NMNAT1 knockout cells and impaired DNA damage sensing by the NAD-dependent DNA break responsive enzyme poly (ADP-ribose) polymerase-1 (PARP1). The dependence of osteosarcoma cells on NMNAT1-derived NAD for the PARP1-dependent DNA repair and survival is not restricted to cisplatin-treated cancer cells but has also been reported to occur in actinomycine D-treated tumor cell lines, as well. These data suggest that nuclear NAD synthesis by NMNAT1 may represent a therapeutic target in osteosarcoma and possibly in other tumors, as well.

adenosine triphosphate
+
nicotinamide mononucleotide
PP_{i}
PP_{i}
nicotinamide adenine dinucleotide

NMNAT enzymatic activity is probably essential at the cellular level, as complete ablation of NMNAT activity in model organisms leads to cellular inviability.

NMNAT1 enhancement opposes the actions of SARM1 which would lead to axon degeneration, but this effect is not due to preventing SARM1 depletion of NAD+.

== Clinical relevance ==
Mutations in this gene have been shown associated to the LCA9 form of the retinal degeneration pathology Leber's congenital amaurosis.

== Aging ==
Aged mice show a significant reduction of NMNAT1 gene products in the liver (which is the main site of de novo synthesis of NAD+). All NMNAT gene isoform products also decline with age in mice in kidneys, oocytes, and colons.
