= SCO2 =

Protein-coding gene in humans

Identifiers
- Aliases: SCO2, CEMCOX1, MYP6, SCO1L, SCO2 cytochrome c oxidase assembly protein, cytochrome c oxidase assembly protein, PD-ECGF, TP, Gliostatin, TYMP, ECGF1, TdRPase, SCO cytochrome c oxidase assembly protein 2, synthesis of cytochrome C oxidase 2, MC4DN2
- External IDs: OMIM: 604272; MGI: 3818630; GeneCards: SCO2
Available structures
PDB	Ortholog search: PDBe RCSB
PDB	List of PDB id codes 2RLI

Gene location (Human)
Chr.	Chromosome 22 (human)
Band	22q13.33	Start	50,523,568 bp
Band	22q13.33	End	50,526,461 bp

Gene location (Mouse)
Chr.	Chromosome 15 (mouse)
Band	15|15 E3	Start	89,255,840 bp
Band	15|15 E3	End	89,258,049 bp
RNA expression pattern
Bgee	Human / Mouse (ortholog); Top expressed in: right uterine tube; granulocyte; mucosa of transverse colon; monocyte; gingival epithelium; gonad; palpebral conjunctiva; periodontal fiber; right lobe of liver; epithelium of bronchus / Top expressed in: yolk sac; blastocyst; embryo; duodenum; colon; proximal tubule; right kidney; muscle of thigh; jejunum; morula; More reference expression data
BioGPS	n/a
Gene ontology
Molecular function	protein binding; copper ion binding; metal ion binding; protein-disulfide reductase activity
Cellular component	myofibril; mitochondrial matrix; mitochondrial inner membrane; mitochondrion; integral component of mitochondrial inner membrane; membrane; integral component of membrane
Biological process	cellular copper ion homeostasis; copper ion transport; eye development; respiratory chain complex IV assembly; cell redox homeostasis; mitochondrial cytochrome c oxidase assembly
Sources:Amigo / QuickGO
Orthologs
Databases	NCBI: entry; OMA: entry
Species	Human	Mouse
Entrez	9997	100126824
Ensembl	ENSG00000284194	ENSMUSG00000091780
UniProt	O43819	Q8VCL2
RefSeq (mRNA)	NM_005138; NM_001169109; NM_001169110; NM_001169111	NM_001111288
RefSeq (protein)	NP_001162580; NP_001162581; NP_001162582; NP_005129	NP_001104758
Location (UCSC)	Chr 22: 50.52 – 50.53 Mb	Chr 15: 89.26 – 89.26 Mb
PubMed search
- Wikidata
View/Edit Human	View/Edit Mouse

SCO2 cytochrome c oxidase assembly (also known as SCO2 homolog, mitochondrial and SCO cytochrome oxidase deficient homolog 2) is a protein that in humans is encoded by the SCO2 gene. The encoded protein is one of the cytochrome c oxidase (COX)(Complex IV) assembly factors. Human COX is a multimeric protein complex that requires several assembly factors. COX catalyzes the transfer of electrons from cytochrome c to molecular oxygen, which helps to maintain the proton gradient across the inner mitochondrial membrane that is necessary for aerobic ATP production. The encoded protein is a metallochaperone that is involved in the biogenesis of cytochrome c oxidase subunit II. Mutations in this gene are associated with fatal infantile encephalocardiomyopathy and myopia 6.

== Structure ==
The SCO2 gene is located on the q arm of chromosome 22 at position 13.33 and it spans 2,871 base pairs. The SCO2 gene produces a 15.1 kDa protein composed of 136 amino acids. The protein contains an N-terminal mitochondrial targeting presequence of 41 amino acids, and shares identity with the yeast protein in regions between glycine-102 and glycine-242 in human SCO2. SCO2 is a subunit of the enzyme Mammalian cytochrome c oxidase (COX)(Complex IV).

== Function ==
The SCO2 gene encodes for a protein essential for the assembly and function of Mammalian cytochrome c oxidase (COX)(Complex IV) of the mitochondrial respiratory chain. SCO2 acts as a metallochaperone involved in the biogenesis of cytochrome c oxidase subunit II, an essential subunit of Complex IV which transfers the electrons from cytochrome c to the bimetallic center of the catalytic subunit 1 via its binuclear copper A center. The biogenesis involves the transport of copper to the Cu(A) site on the cytochrome c oxidase subunit II leading to the proper synthesis and maturation of the subunit. In addition, SCO2 acts as a thiol-disulfide oxidoreductase to regulate the redox state of the cysteines in SCO1 during maturation of the cytochrome c oxidase subunit II. The maturation and synthesis of cytochrome c oxidase subunit II is required for the function of COX. Complex IV, a multimeric protein complex that requires several assembly factors, catalyzes the transfer of reducing equivalents from cytochrome c to molecular oxygen and pumps protons across the inner mitochondrial membrane.

== Clinical significance ==
Mutations in SCO2 that alter the regulation of copper and oxygen have been found to be associated with fatal infantile Cardioencephalomyopathy due to cytochrome c oxidase deficiency 1 (CEMCOX1), Myopia 6 (MYP6), and Leigh syndrome (LS). CEMCOX1 is characterized by disorders characterized by hypotonia, developmental delay, hypertrophic cardiomyopathy, lactic acidosis, gliosis, neuronal loss in basal ganglia, brainstem and spinal cord, and cytochrome c oxidase deficiency. Myopia 6 is characterized by a refractive error of the eye, in which parallel rays from a distant object come to focus in front of the retina, vision being better for near objects than for far. Lastly, Leigh syndrome is an early-onset progressive neurodegenerative disorder characterized by the presence of focal, bilateral lesions in one or more areas of the central nervous system including the brainstem, thalamus, basal ganglia, cerebellum and spinal cord. Clinical manifestations may include psychomotor retardation, hypotonia, ataxia, weakness, vision loss, eye movement abnormalities, seizures, and dysphagia. A pathogenic mutation of G1541A in a patient has shown strong evidence in neonatal hypotonia with an SMA 1 phenotype, and has been found to result in less COX deficiencies. A mutation of 1602T>G has been found to result in rapidly progressive disease phenotypes. Other pathogenic mutations have included a missense mutation of E140K, a nonsense mutation Q53X, and a 1541G > A mutation which resulted in a severe protein instability.

== Interactions ==
In addition to co-complex interactions, SCO2 has been found to interact with COA6, THEM177 in a COX20-dependent manner, COX20, COX16, SCO1, and others.
