= Pyrinuron =

Names
- Preferred IUPAC name N-(4-Nitrophenyl)-N′-[(pyridin-3-yl)methyl]urea
- Other names Pyriminil; Vacor

Identifiers
CAS Number	53558-25-1
3D model (JSmol)	Interactive image
ChemSpider	37276
ECHA InfoCard	100.053.279
PubChem CID	40813
UNII	Q7BGS137YP
CompTox Dashboard (EPA)	DTXSID1042360
- InChI: InChI=1S/C13H12N4O3/c18-13(15-9-10-2-1-7-14-8-10)16-11-3-5-12(6-4-11)17(19)20/h1-8H,9H2,(H2,15,16,18) Key: CLKZWXHKFXZIMA-UHFFFAOYSA-N; InChI=1/C13H12N4O3/c18-13(15-9-10-2-1-7-14-8-10)16-11-3-5-12(6-4-11)17(19)20/h1-8H,9H2,(H2,15,16,18) Key: CLKZWXHKFXZIMA-UHFFFAOYAA
- SMILES: [O-][N+](=O)c1ccc(cc1)NC(=O)NCc2cccnc2

Properties
Chemical formula	C_{13}H_{12}N_{4}O_{3}
Molar mass	272.264 g·mol^{−1}

Hazards
- Occupational safety and health (OHS/OSH)
Main hazards	Toxic
- Except where otherwise noted, data are given for materials in their standard state (at 25 °C [77 °F], 100 kPa). verify (what is ?) Infobox references

Pyrinuron (Pyriminil, Vacor) is a chemical compound formerly used as a rodenticide. Commercial distribution was voluntarily suspended in 1979 and it is not approved by the Environmental Protection Agency for use in the United States. If it is ingested by humans in high doses, it may selectively destroy insulin-producing beta cells in the pancreas causing type 1 diabetes. The neurodegeneration associated with Vacor is caused by its conversion to Vacor-mononucleotide (VMN) by NAMPT and VMN's subsequent activation of the NADase SARM1.
