= Nicotinamide-nucleotide adenylyltransferase =

Class of enzymes

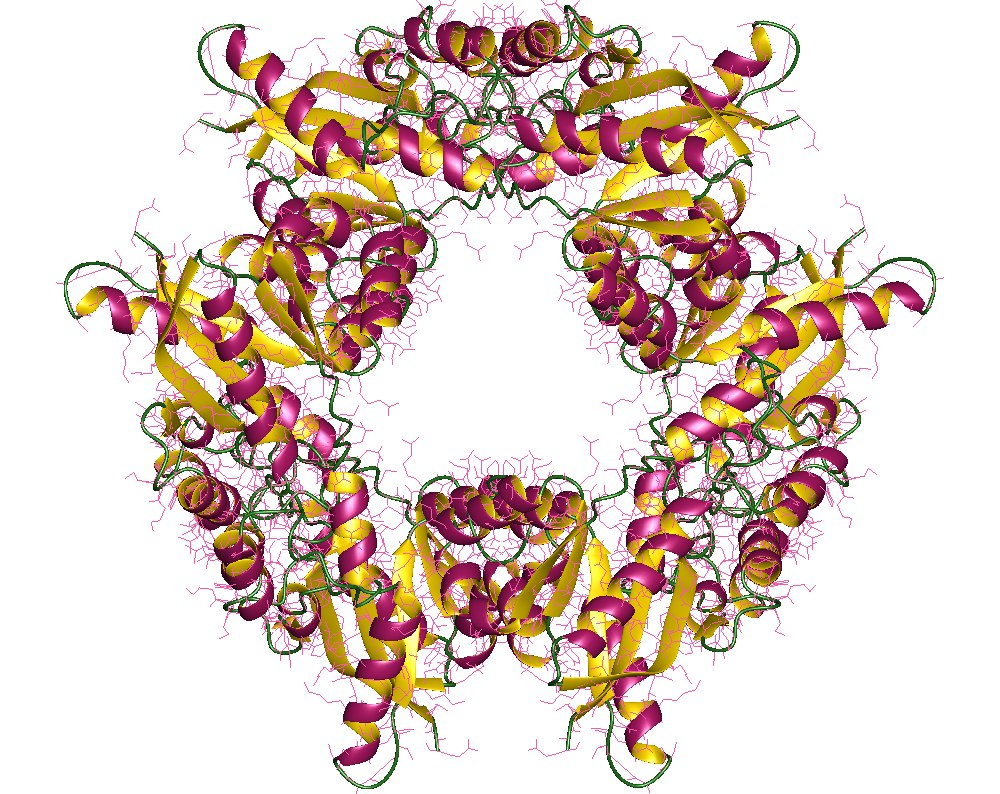
- Nicotinamide-nucleotide adenylyltransferase (nuclear) hexamer, Human

Identifiers
- EC no.: 2.7.7.1
- CAS no.: 9032-70-6

Databases
- IntEnz: IntEnz view
- BRENDA: BRENDA entry
- ExPASy: NiceZyme view
- KEGG: KEGG entry
- MetaCyc: metabolic pathway
- PRIAM: profile
- PDB structures: RCSB PDB PDBe PDBsum
- Gene Ontology: AmiGO / QuickGO
Search
- PMC: articles
- PubMed: articles
- NCBI: proteins

Nicotinamide-nucleotide adenylyltransferase (NMNAT) (EC 2.7.7.1) is an enzyme that catalyzes the reversible chemical reaction that produces nicotinamide adenine dinucleotide from adenosine triphosphate and nicotinamide mononucleotide.

== Function ==
Nicotinamide adenine dinucleotide, is a coenzyme found in all cells. It is produced by nicotinamide-nucleotide adenylyltransferase, which combines adenosine triphosphate and nicotinamide mononucleotide, with inorganic pyrophosphate (PP_{i}) produced as a byproduct:

adenosine triphosphate
+
nicotinamide mononucleotide
PP_{i}
PP_{i}
nicotinamide adenine dinucleotide

The enzyme has been characterised from mammalian liver, Escherichia coli and yeast.

Humans have three protein isoforms: NMNAT1 (widespread), NMNAT2 (predominantly in brain), and NMNAT3 (highest in liver, heart, skeletal muscle, and erythrocytes). Mutations in the NMNAT1 gene lead to the LCA9 form of Leber congenital amaurosis. Mutations in NMNAT2 or NMNAT3 genes are not known to cause any human disease. NMNAT2 is critical for neurons: loss of NMNAT2 is associated with neurodegeneration. All NMNAT isoforms reportedly decline with age.

=== Isoform cellular localization ===
The three protein isoforms have the following cellular localizations

- NMNAT1 : Nucleus
- NMNAT2 : Cytoplasm
- NMNAT3 : Mitochondrion or cytoplasm

All three NMNATs compete for the nicotinamide mononucleotide produced by nicotinamide phosphoribosyltransferase.

== Nomenclature ==
This enzyme is a transferases, specifically one transferring phosphorus-containing nucleotide groups (nucleotidyltransferases). The systematic name of this enzyme class is ATP:nicotinamide-nucleotide adenylyltransferase. Other names in common use include NAD+ pyrophosphorylase, adenosine triphosphate-nicotinamide mononucleotide transadenylase, ATP:NMN adenylyltransferase, diphosphopyridine nucleotide pyrophosphorylase, nicotinamide adenine dinucleotide pyrophosphorylase, nicotinamide mononucleotide adenylyltransferase, and NMN adenylyltransferase.

== Structural studies ==
As of late 2007, 11 structures have been solved for this class of enzymes, with PDB accession codes PDB: 1EJ2, PDB: 1GZU, PDB: 1HYB, PDB: 1KKU, PDB: 1KQN, PDB: 1KQO, PDB: 1KR2, PDB: 1M8F, PDB: 1M8G, PDB: 1M8J, and PDB: 1M8K.

== Clinical significance ==
Chronic inflammation due to obesity and other causes reduced NMNAT and NAD+ levels in many tissues.
