= ADP-ribosyl cyclase =

Enzyme

ADP-ribosyl cyclase/cyclic ADP-ribose hydrolase
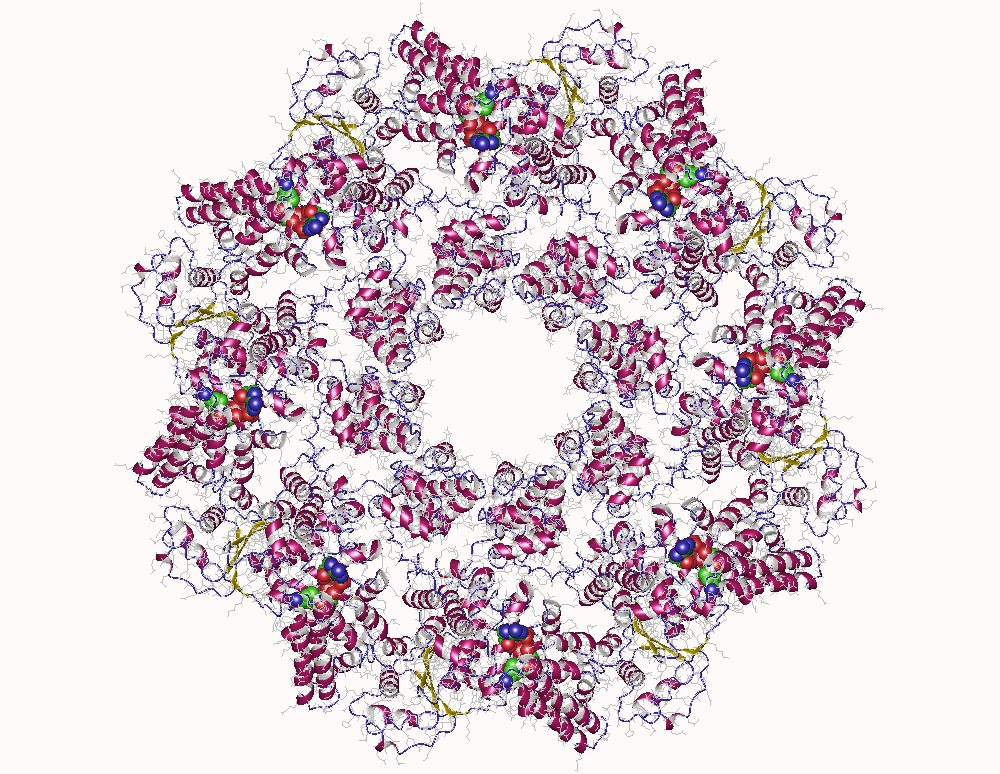
- ADP-ribosyl cyclase homooctamer, Human

Identifiers
- EC no.: 3.2.2.6
- CAS no.: 9025-46-1

Databases
- BRENDA: enzyme data
- ExPASy: NiceZyme view
- KEGG: enzyme entry
- MetaCyc: metabolic pathway
- Rhea: reactions
- PDB structures: RCSB PDB PDBe PDBsum
- Gene Ontology: AmiGO / QuickGO
Search
- PMC: articles
- PubMed: articles
- NCBI: proteins

ADP-ribosyl cyclase/cyclic ADP-ribose hydrolase (EC 3.2.2.6) is a bifunctional enzyme that catalyzes the two-step chemical reaction

nicotinamide adenine dinucleotide
nicotinamide
+
cyclic ADP-ribose
H_{2}O
adenosine diphosphate ribose

The enyzme cyclises nicotinamide adenine dinucleotide (a cation) to give initially nicotinamide and cyclic ADP-ribose as intermediate. The latter is then hydrolyzed to adenosine diphosphate ribose (ADP-ribose). This makes it different from NAD^{+} glycohydrolase (EC 3.2.2.5), where the hydrolysis gives ADP-ribose directly. The enzyme was characterised from beef spleen. The enzyme is also present in bacteria and humans.

This enzyme is a hydrolase, specifically a glycosylase that hydrolyses N-glycosyl compounds. Other names of this enzyme include nicotinamide adenine dinucleotide (phosphate) nucleosidase, triphosphopyridine nucleotidase, NAD(P) nucleosidase, NAD(P)ase, and nicotinamide adenine dinucleotide (phosphate) glycohydrolase.
