= NAD+ glycohydrolase =

Class of enzymes

NAD^{+} glycohydrolase
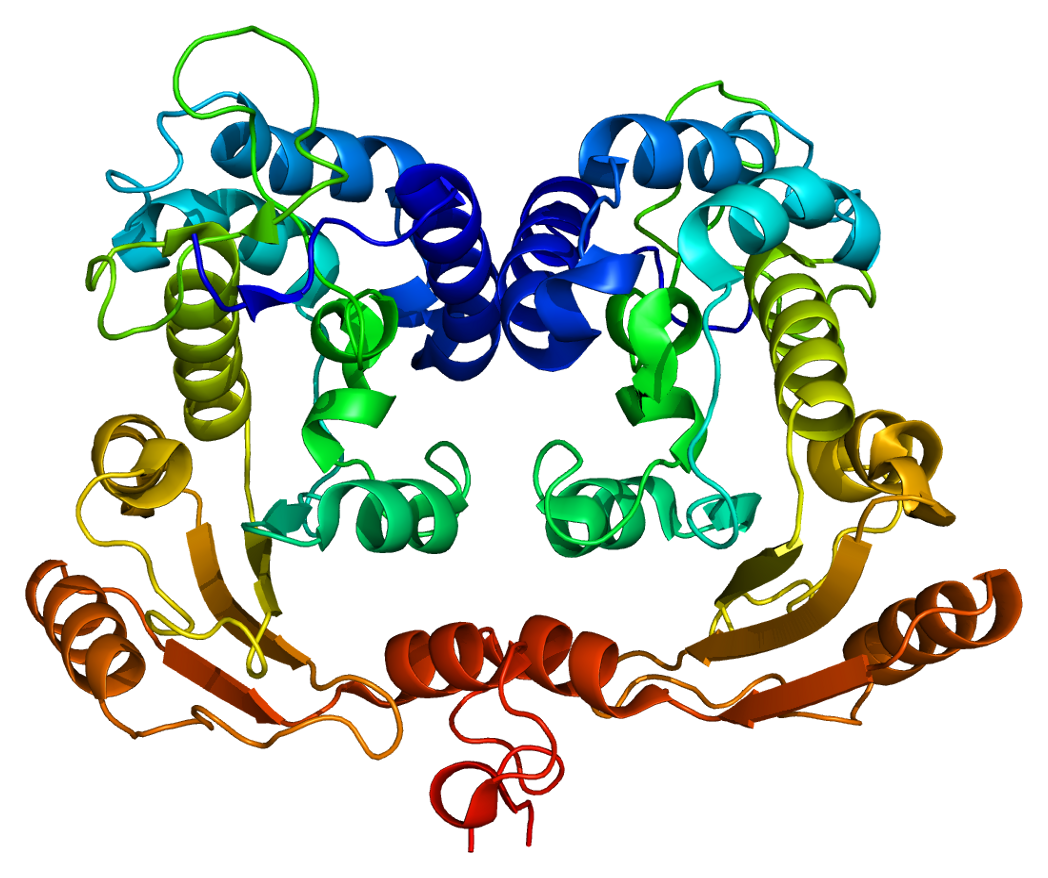

Identifiers
- EC no.: 3.2.2.5
- CAS no.: 9032-65-9

Databases
- BRENDA: enzyme data
- ExPASy: NiceZyme view
- KEGG: enzyme entry
- MetaCyc: metabolic pathway
- Rhea: reactions
- PDB structures: RCSB PDB PDBe PDBsum
- Gene Ontology: AmiGO / QuickGO
Search
- PMC: articles
- PubMed: articles
- NCBI: proteins

NAD^{+} glycohydrolase (EC 3.2.2.5) is an enzyme that catalyzes the chemical reaction

nicotinamide adenine dinucleotide
H_{2}O
nicotinamide
+
adenosine diphosphate ribose

The enzyme hydrolyses nicotinamide adenine dinucleotide (a cation) to give nicotinamide and adenosine diphosphate ribose (ADP-ribose). Unlike ADP-ribosyl cyclase/cyclic ADP-ribose hydrolase (EC 3.2.2.6), which catalyzes the same reaction, this reaction does not proceed through a cyclic ADP-ribose.

This enzyme participates in nicotinate and nicotinamide metabolism and the calcium signaling pathway. Calcium metabolism involves the regulation of the levels of calcium in the body. The role this calcium plays also includes providing enough calcium for bone mineralization. It serves as the basis for the structure and rigidity of bones. Calcium metabolism can lead to a variety of diseases which can involve renal function. High concentrations of calcium can lead to cell death or apoptosis.

== Nomenclature ==
This enzyme belongs tois a hydrolase, specifically a glycosylase that hydrolyses N-glycosyl compounds. The systematic name of this enzyme class is NAD^{+} glycohydrolase. Other names in use include:

- NAD+ nucleosidase,
- NADase,
- DPNase,
- DPN hydrolase,
- NAD hydrolase,
- diphosphopyridine nucleosidase,
- nicotinamide adenine dinucleotide nucleosidase,
- NAD glycohydrolase,
- NAD nucleosidase, and
- nicotinamide adenine dinucleotide glycohydrolase.

== Immunoregulation ==
NADase is important to regulating adaptive immunity as T cells contain enzymes such as CD38 and SARM1 that consumes NAD+.

=== CD38 ===
CD38 is an enzyme that triggers inflammatory responses and type II CD38 contains an ecto-NADase or extracellular NADase, whereas type II CD38 contains an intracellular cADPR. CD38 consumes NAD, which can produce second messengers that help regulate immune activity. Cells that are programmed for cell death or apoptosis releases NAD+, and type II CD38 help recycle the extracellular NAD+ released from apoptosis, where both products of NADase, ADP-ribose and nicotinamide, can be used to resynthesize NAD+ via the NAD+ synthesis pathway. ADP-ribose must be converted to adenosine in order to enter the NAD+ synthesis pathway, where ADP-ribose first gets converted to AMP and then AMP gets converted to adenosine via non-classical adenosine generational pathway. The other product nicotinamide is membrane permeable, which allows the molecule to re-enter the NAD synthesis pathway more easily. CD38 NADase is also found in tissues and cells other than T cells, and CD38 is one of the main forms of NADase activity in mammals.

=== SARM1 ===
SARM1 is a Toll-like receptor protein and also functions as a intracellular NADase. Under normal circumstances NADase activity are inhibited in the presence of NAD+, where NAD+ binds to armadillo/heat motifs (ARMs), which inhibits the dimerization of the toll-like receptor domain that activates the NADase activity. If there are damages to the binding site of NAD+ or disruption that prevents the interaction between ARMs and the toll-like receptor domain, NADase activity will be turned on at a constitutive level. As a result SARM1 will have higher consumption of NAD+ and produce NADase products (ADP-ribose and nicotinamide) rather than the production of cADPR from ADP-ribosyl cyclase.
