= DTX2 =

Protein-coding gene in the species Homo sapiens

Identifiers
- Aliases: DTX2, RNF58, deltex 2, E3 ubiquitin ligase, deltex E3 ubiquitin ligase 2
- External IDs: OMIM: 613141; MGI: 1921448; GeneCards: DTX2
Available structures
PDB	Ortholog search: PDBe RCSB
PDB	List of PDB id codes 1V87
Enzyme activity
EC #	BRENDA	ExPASy	KEGG	MetaCyc
2.3.2.27	↗	↗	↗	↗

Gene location (Human)
Chr.	Chromosome 7 (human)
Band	7q11.23	Start	76,461,676 bp
Band	7q11.23	End	76,505,995 bp

Gene location (Mouse)
Chr.	Chromosome 5 (mouse)
Band	5|5 G2	Start	136,023,654 bp
Band	5|5 G2	End	136,061,726 bp
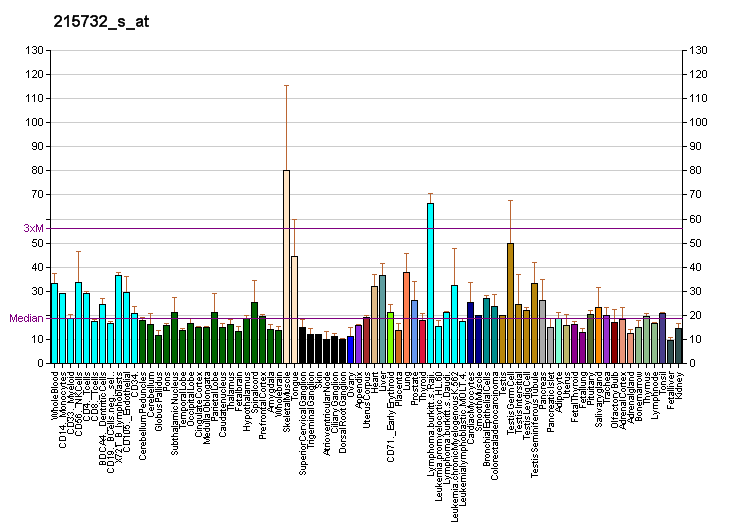
RNA expression pattern
Bgee	Human / Mouse (ortholog); Top expressed in: mucosa of transverse colon; olfactory zone of nasal mucosa; sural nerve; right testis; minor salivary glands; left testis; blood; skin of leg; skin of abdomen; vagina / Top expressed in: secondary oocyte; primary oocyte; zygote; Rostral migratory stream; condyle; internal carotid artery; fossa; external carotid artery; hair follicle; motor neuron; More reference expression data
BioGPS	More reference expression data
Gene ontology
Molecular function	zinc ion binding; protein binding; metal ion binding; transferase activity
Cellular component	cytoplasm; nuclear membrane; nucleus; nucleoplasm
Biological process	Notch signaling pathway; protein ubiquitination
Sources:Amigo / QuickGO
Orthologs
Databases	NCBI: entry; OMA: entry
Species	Human	Mouse
Entrez	113878	74198
Ensembl	ENSG00000282379; ENSG00000091073	ENSMUSG00000004947
UniProt	Q86UW9	Q8R3P2
RefSeq (mRNA)	NM_001102594; NM_001102595; NM_001102596; NM_020892	NM_001256096; NM_001256097; NM_001256098; NM_023742
RefSeq (protein)	NP_001096064; NP_001096065; NP_001096066; NP_065943	NP_001243025; NP_001243026; NP_001243027; NP_076231
Location (UCSC)	Chr 7: 76.46 – 76.51 Mb	Chr 5: 136.02 – 136.06 Mb
PubMed search
- Wikidata
View/Edit Human	View/Edit Mouse

Protein deltex-2 also known as E3 ubiquitin-protein ligase DTX2 is an enzyme that in humans is encoded by the DTX2 gene.

DTX2 functions as a ubiquitin E3 ligase in conjunction with the E2 enzyme UBCH5A.
