= MROH8 =

Protein-coding gene in the species Homo sapiens

Identifiers
- Aliases: MROH8, C20orf131, C20orf132, dJ621N11.3, dJ621N11.4, maestro heat like repeat family member 8
- External IDs: MGI: 3603828; GeneCards: MROH8

Gene location (Human)
| Chr. | Chromosome 20 (human) |
| Band | 20q11.23 | Start | 37,101,226 bp |
| Band | 20q11.23 | End | 37,179,588 bp |

Gene location (Mouse)
| Chr. | Chromosome 2 (mouse) |
| Band | 2|2 H1 | Start | 157,050,470 bp |
| Band | 2|2 H1 | End | 157,121,469 bp |
RNA expression pattern
| Bgee | Human / Mouse (ortholog); Top expressed in: right testis; left testis; gonad; testicle; muscle of thigh; buccal mucosa cell; sperm; bone marrow cell; gastrocnemius muscle; apex of heart / Top expressed in: spermatocyte; spermatid; testicle; morula; embryo; blastocyst; primary oocyte; yolk sac; muscle tissue; quadriceps femoris muscle; More reference expression data |
| BioGPS | n/a |
Orthologs
| Databases | NCBI: entry; OMA: entry |
| Species | Human | Mouse |
| Entrez | 140699 | 629499 |
| Ensembl | ENSG00000101353 | ENSMUSG00000074627 |
| UniProt | Q9H579 | n/a |
| RefSeq (mRNA) | NM_213632; NM_152503; NM_213631 | NM_001039557 |
| RefSeq (protein) | NP_689716; NP_998796; NP_998797 | n/a |
| Location (UCSC) | Chr 20: 37.1 – 37.18 Mb | Chr 2: 157.05 – 157.12 Mb |
| PubMed search |
- Wikidata
| View/Edit Human | View/Edit Mouse |

MROH8 is a protein in humans that is encoded by the MROH8 gene.
