= NMNAT3 =

Enzyme found in humans

Identifiers
- Aliases: NMNAT3, PNAT-3, PNAT3, FKSG76, nicotinamide nucleotide adenylyltransferase 3
- External IDs: OMIM: 608702; MGI: 1921330; GeneCards: NMNAT3
Available structures
PDB	Ortholog search: PDBe RCSB
PDB	List of PDB id codes 1NUP, 1NUQ, 1NUR, 1NUS, 1NUT, 1NUU
Enzyme activity
EC #	BRENDA	ExPASy	KEGG	MetaCyc
2.7.7.1	↗	↗	↗	↗
2.7.7.18	↗	↗	↗	↗

Gene location (Human)
Chr.	Chromosome 3 (human)
Band	3q23	Start	139,560,180 bp
Band	3q23	End	139,678,017 bp

Gene location (Mouse)
Chr.	Chromosome 9 (mouse)
Band	9|9 E3.3	Start	98,169,488 bp
Band	9|9 E3.3	End	98,302,491 bp
RNA expression pattern
Bgee	Human / Mouse (ortholog); Top expressed in: testicle; left testis; right testis; sperm; skin of arm; muscle of thigh; left ovary; skin of leg; epithelium of colon; gastrocnemius muscle / Top expressed in: spermatocyte; spermatid; right lobe of liver; right kidney; sternocleidomastoid muscle; triceps brachii muscle; temporal muscle; parotid gland; myocardium of ventricle; gastrula; More reference expression data
BioGPS	n/a
Gene ontology
Molecular function	transferase activity; nucleotide binding; nucleotidyltransferase activity; catalytic activity; ATP binding; nicotinamide-nucleotide adenylyltransferase activity; nicotinate-nucleotide adenylyltransferase activity
Cellular component	mitochondrion; mitochondrial matrix; axon; soma
Biological process	pyridine nucleotide biosynthetic process; biosynthesis; response to wounding; NAD metabolic process; NAD biosynthetic process; 'de novo' NAD biosynthetic process from aspartate; response to tumor necrosis factor
Sources:Amigo / QuickGO
Orthologs
Databases	NCBI: entry; OMA: entry
Species	Human	Mouse
Entrez	349565	74080
Ensembl	ENSG00000163864	ENSMUSG00000032456
UniProt	Q96T66	Q99JR6
RefSeq (mRNA)	NM_001200047; NM_178177; NM_001320510; NM_001320511; NM_001320512 NM_001320513; NM_001363968	NM_144533; NM_001357445; NM_001357446; NM_001357449; NM_001357451 NM_001357452
RefSeq (protein)	NP_001186976; NP_001307439; NP_001307440; NP_001307441; NP_001307442 NP_835471; NP_001350897	NP_653116; NP_001344374; NP_001344375; NP_001344378; NP_001344380 NP_001344381
Location (UCSC)	Chr 3: 139.56 – 139.68 Mb	Chr 9: 98.17 – 98.3 Mb
PubMed search
- Wikidata
View/Edit Human	View/Edit Mouse

Nicotinamide mononucleotide adenylyltransferase 3 (NMNAT3) is an enzyme that in humans is encoded by the NMNAT3 gene.

NMNAT3 is the third of three protein isoforms of nicotinamide-nucleotide adenylyltransferase (NMNAT) found in humans. As with the other NMNATs, NMNAT3 is an enzyme that catalyzes nicotinamide adenine dinucleotide (NAD) synthesis. NMNAT3 levels are highest in liver, heart, skeletal muscle, and erythrocytes.

Adenosine triphosphate
+
Nicotinamide mononucleotide
PP_{i}
PP_{i}
Nicotinamide adenine dinucleotide

NMNAT3 is localized in mitochondria or cytoplasm, depending upon the cell type. Knockdown of NMNAT3 gene expression in cell culture strongly reduces mitochondrial function. NMNAT3 is essential for maintaining NAD in red blood cells.

The catechin epigallocatechin gallate found in tea can activate NMNAT3 by more than 40%.

Until January 2026, mutations in the NMNAT3 gene had not been associated with any known human disease, although it had been discovered that NMNAT3 deficiency causes hemolytic anemia in mice. In January 2026, researchers at the University Medical Center Utrecht in Utrecht, The Netherlands, were the first to link NMNAT3 deficiency to disease in vivo, in a patient with unexplained hereditary hemolytic anemia. The patient was successfully treated by supplementing NAD.
