= MROH9 =

Mammalian gene

Identifiers
- Aliases: MROH9, ARMC11, C1orf129, maestro heat like repeat family member 9
- External IDs: MGI: 1925508; GeneCards: MROH9

Gene location (Human)
Chr.	Chromosome 1 (human)
Band	1q24.3	Start	170,935,526 bp
Band	1q24.3	End	171,064,765 bp

Gene location (Mouse)
Chr.	Chromosome 1 (mouse)
Band	1|1 H2.1	Start	162,851,871 bp
Band	1|1 H2.1	End	162,913,239 bp
RNA expression pattern
Bgee	Human / Mouse (ortholog); Top expressed in: testicle; olfactory zone of nasal mucosa; right uterine tube; bronchial epithelial cell; right lung; left testis; right testis; endometrium; corpus callosum; gonad / Top expressed in: spermatid; seminiferous tubule; spermatocyte; ovary; visual cortex; More reference expression data
BioGPS	n/a
Orthologs
Databases	NCBI: entry; OMA: entry
Species	Human	Mouse
Entrez	80133	78258
Ensembl	ENSG00000117501	ENSMUSG00000071890
UniProt	Q5TGP6	G5E8L9
RefSeq (mRNA)	NM_001163629; NM_025063	NM_030071
RefSeq (protein)	NP_001157101; NP_079339	NP_084347
Location (UCSC)	Chr 1: 170.94 – 171.06 Mb	Chr 1: 162.85 – 162.91 Mb
PubMed search
- Wikidata
View/Edit Human	View/Edit Mouse

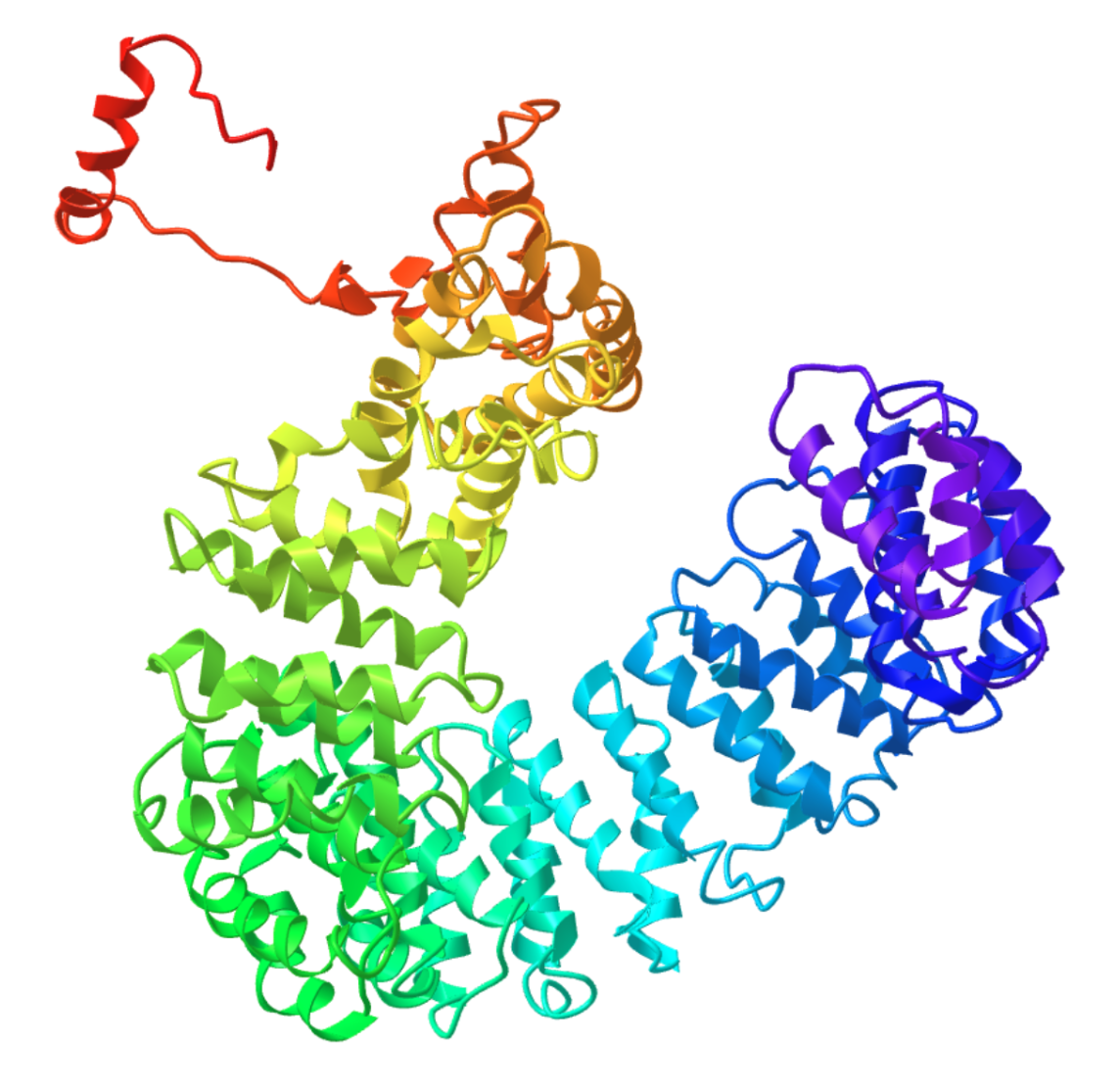
MROH9 protein isoform 1 tertiary structure as found from I-Tasser and visualized with the NCBI iCN 3D Structure tool.

Maestro heat-like repeat-containing protein family member 9 (MROH9) is a protein which in humans is encoded by the MROH9 gene. The word 'maestro' itself is an acronym, standing for male-specific transcription in the developing reproductive organs (MRO). MRO genes belong to the MROH family, which includes MROH9.

== Gene ==
MROH9 is also known as C1orf129 and ARMC11 (armadillo repeat-containing 11). The genomic location is on chromosome 1 (1q24.3) on its plus end, spanning 129,232 base pairs.

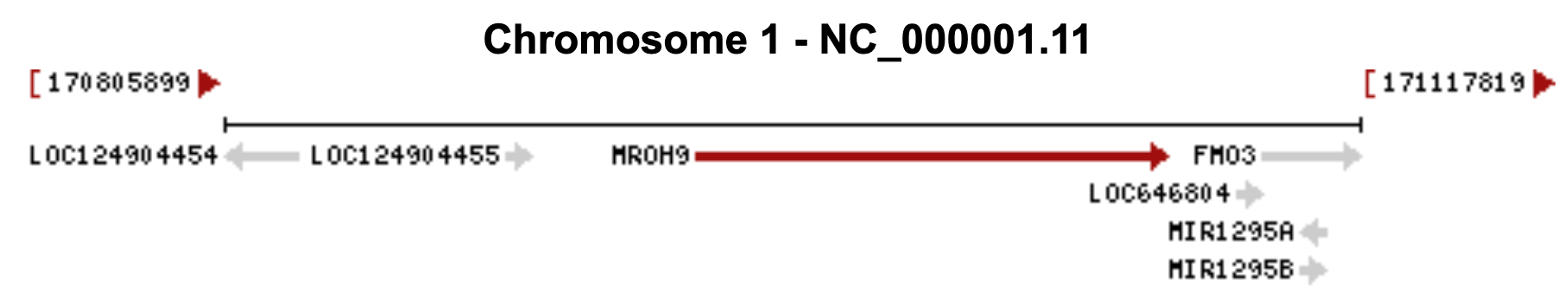
MROH9 genomic location on chromosome 1.

== Transcript ==
The MROH9 gene is encoded by an mRNA transcript that is 3,102 nucleotides in length. mRNA transcript variant 1 (NM_001163629.2), which encodes protein isoform 1 (NP_001157101.1), is the longest transcript encoding the longest, highest-quality isoform. Transcript variant 2 is found to have a shorter, more distant C-terminus, and an alternative 3' coding region and 3' UTR compared to variant 1. Transcript variant 1 has 23 exons, making up a coding sequence that is 2,586 nucleotides long.

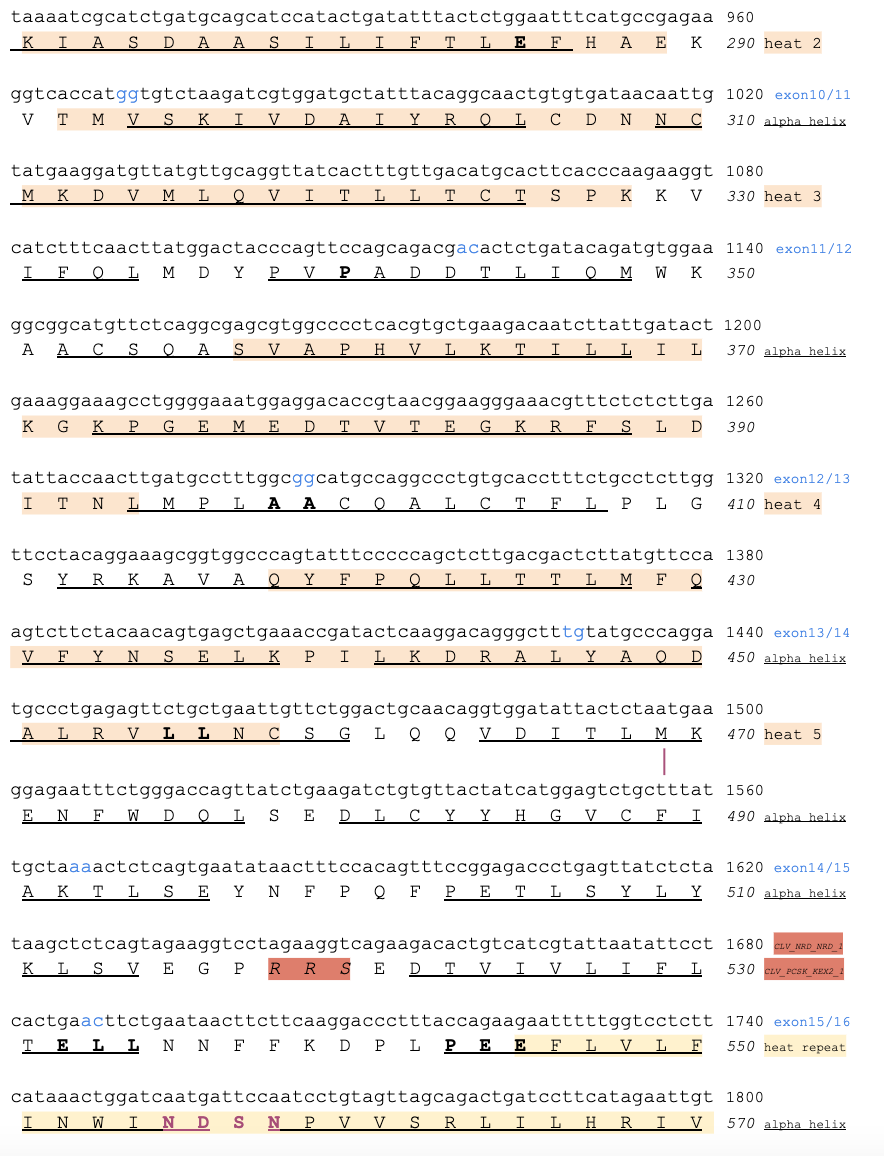
Middle region of an annotated conceptual translation for the MROH9 protein sequence and nucleotide transcript. Annotations show HEAT regions, alpha helices, exon boundaries, well-conserved amino acids (in bold), and eukaryotic linear motifs (ELMs).

== Protein ==
The dominant isoform protein that the MROH9 encodes is isoform 1, with a length of 861 amino acids. Table 1 displays some of the other common protein isoforms of the MROH9.

Table 1: Different isoforms of the MROH9 gene.
**Isoform**	**Accession number**	**Length (a.a.)**	**Exons**	**Domains**
1	NP_001157101.1	861	23	5 HEATs, 2 HEAT repeats
2	NP_079339.2	573	15	5 HEATs
X1	XP_011508307.1	811	21	3 HEAT repeats
X2	XP_011508308.1	803	20	none
X3	XP_011508309.1	546	12	3 HEAT repeats

=== Domains ===
Of the 11 MROH genes in the family, all of their respective proteins contain HEAT repeats, a type of protein structural motif made up of a short loop linking two alpha helices. HEAT repeats, structurally related to armadillo repeats, are known to form superhelical structures involved in intracellular transport. Protein isoform 1 encoded by the MROH9 gene has 5 HEAT regions and 2 HEAT repeats; the quantity of these vary across the different isoforms, as seen in the table.

=== Structure ===
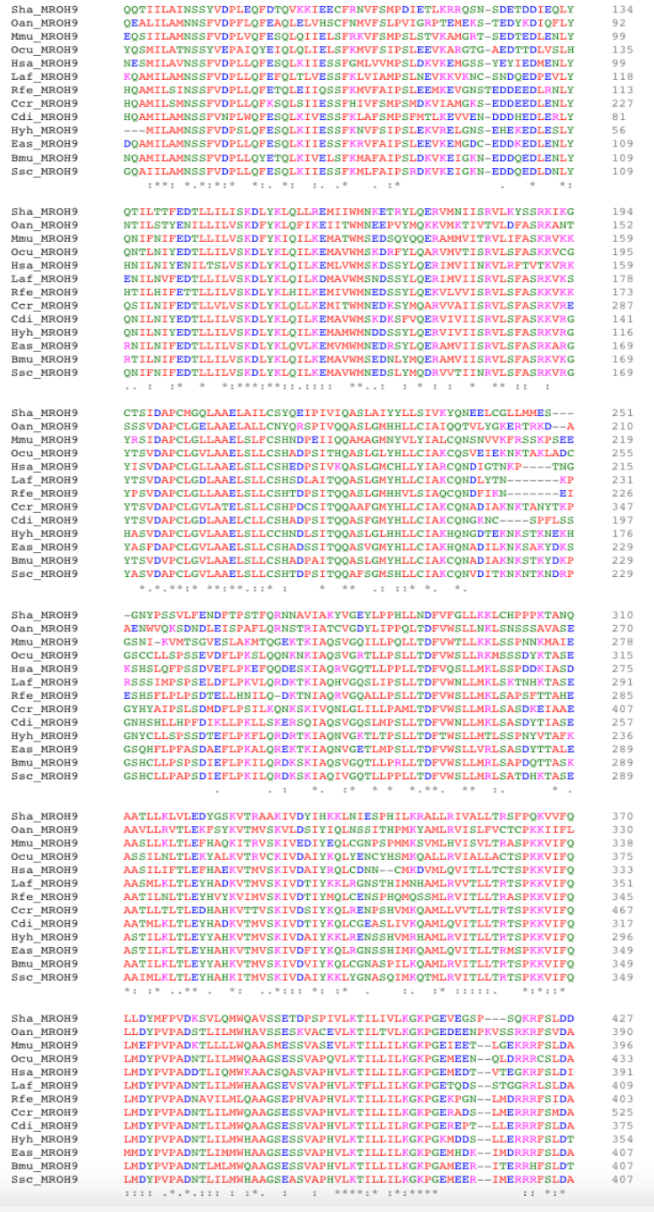
A multiple sequence alignment of strict orthologs of the MROH9 gene in other mammalian taxons, showing the protein sequence from amino acids 39–391 in humans,

The secondary structure of human MROH9 protein isoform 1 has 49 alpha helices with no apparent sheets or coils. The I-TASSER result displaying the tertiary structure with the highest probability score is pictured at the top of the page, and this structure was seen across orthologs, as well.

== Regulation ==
=== Gene level ===
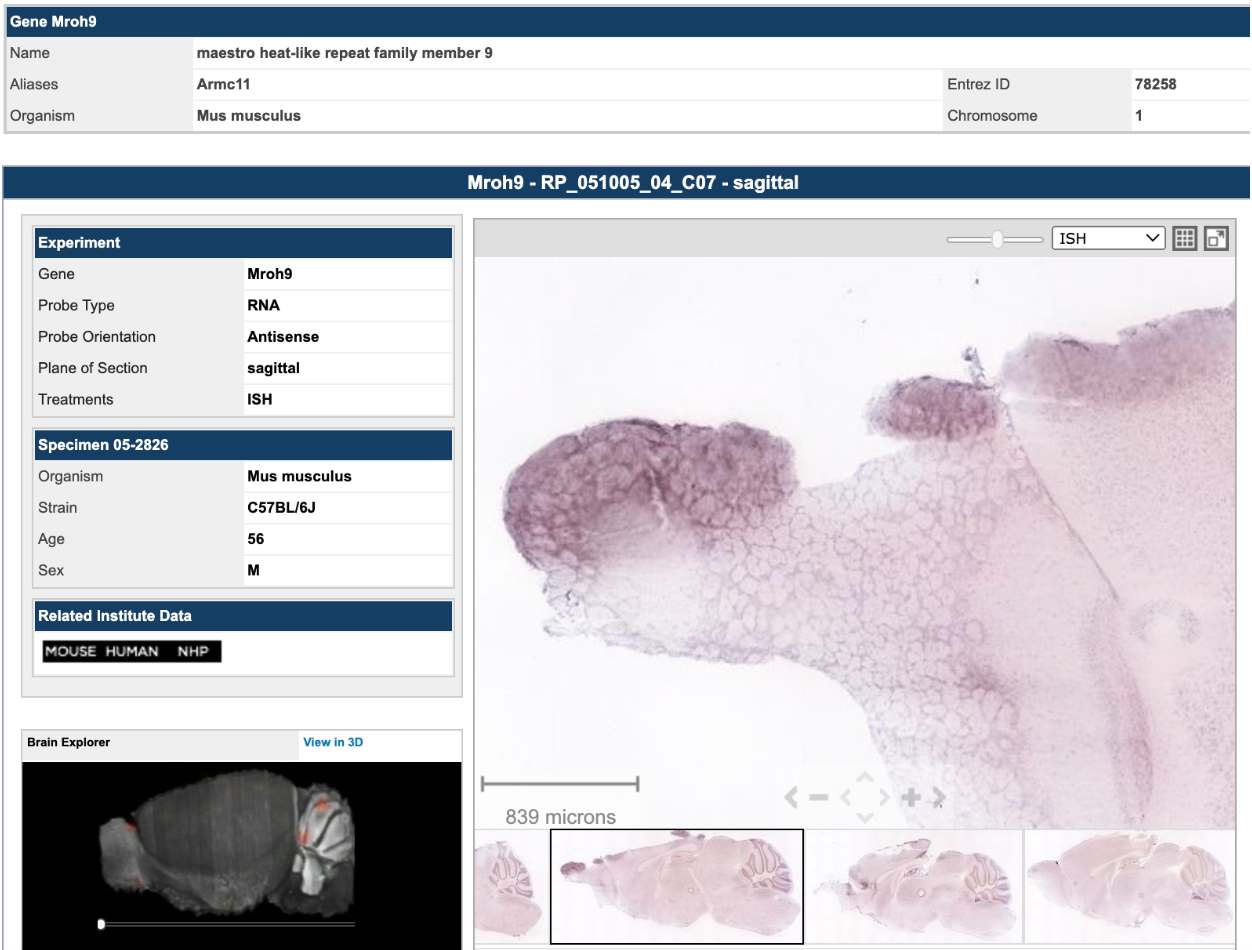
Heightened localized expression of the MROH9 gene found in the olfactory bulb region of the mouse brain.

The encoded transcript of MRO genes were found in one study to exhibit "sexual dimorphic expression during murine gonadal development." The researchers also found increased expression of MRO genes in human testicular tissue, and a particular cytoplasmic expression pattern of the protein in testicular germ cells.

RNAseq data from NCBI Gene shows that MROH9 in humans is only consistently expressed in the lungs and no other tissue, though it shows notable expression in the intestines, stomach, and male/female gonads in almost all of the sets. Low probability scores imply that this gene might be expressed at very low levels. Microarray-assessed tissue expression pattern data from confirms that expression is higher in the lungs, though very low across all other various tissues. Conditional expression pattern data shows that MROH9 is not particularly expressed in any one condition over the other.

The Allen Mouse Brain Atlas confirm the gene's expression in lung, intestine, and gonad tissue. MROH9 expression specifically correlates with a cluster that specializes in cilium organization and cilia cells. The Allen Mouse Brain Atlas also shows that the gene shows significant levels of expression in the olfactory bulb region of the brain. Since the lung, gonads, intestines, and nose all require cilia cells to function, it is possible that the MROH9 gene confers the function of such tissues.

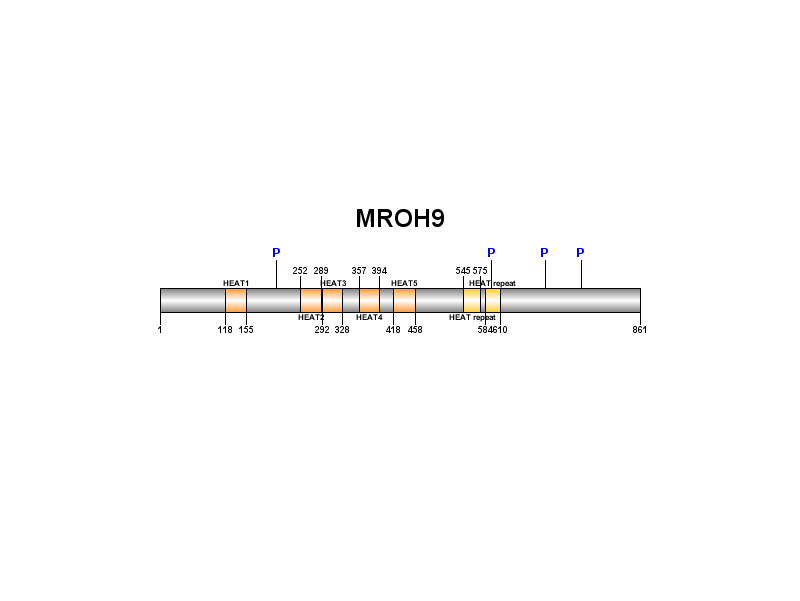
Cartoon visualizing important domains and sites on the MROH9 protein, including HEAT repeat regions and predicted phosphorylation sites.

=== Protein level ===
Subcellular localization of the MROH9 isoform 1 protein is predicted to be within the cytoplasm. This is consistent across strict and distant orthologs, too, as the MROH9 protein shows cytoplasmic subcellular localization across most mammalian taxons. However, predicted data report that the protein could be important in the mitochondria, endoplasmic reticulum, and Golgi apparatus.

Predicted post-translational modifications reported by MyHits Motif Scan show that the MROH9 protein may have 27 phosphorylation sites, 7 N-linked glycosylation sites, and 4 myristoylation sites. However, considering that the probability scores are very low and that this protein is most probably located in the cytoplasm - meaning that it does not travel across membranes - predicted N-linked glycosylation and myristoylation sites are likely null. Phosphorylation is the only likely modification that can occur for this protein, but only a small handful of the predicted sites are conserved across MROH9 orthologs. Other phosphorylation sites, along with all the predicted N-linked glycosylation and myristoylation sites, are quite poorly conserved across orthologs. Predicted eukaryotic linear motifs (ELMs) show several matched sequences for cleavage sites, implying that the MROH9 protein sequence might be cleaved as part of its function.

== Evolution ==
Table 2: MROH9 mammalian orthologs and related properties.
**Scientific name**	**Common name**	**Taxon**	**median date of divergence (MYA)**	**Accession #**	**Length (amino acids)**	**% identity to humans**	**% similarity to humans**
Homo sapiens	Human	Primates	0	NP_001157101.1	861	100%	100%
Chlorocebus sabaeus	Green monkey	Primates	29	XP_037842145.1	891	87%	92%
Ochotona curzoniae	Black-lipped pika	Glires	87	XP_040842726.1	921	63%	77%
Mus musculus	House mouse	Glires	87	NP_084347.1	891	59%	76%
Balenoptera musculus	Blue whale	Artiodactyla	94	XP_036729523.1	912	70%	82%
Sus scrofa	Wild pig	Artiodactyla	94	XP_020919615.1	912	70%	81%
Hyaena hyaena	Striped hyena	Carnivora	94	XP_039077615.1	858	68%	81%
Condylura cristata	Star-nosed mole	Eulipotyphla	94	XP_004688175.1	1007	64%	80%
Rhinolophus ferrumequinum	Greater horseshoe bat	Chiroptera	94	XP_032948567.1	884	65%	79%
Equus asinus	Ass	Perissodactyla	94	XP_044614605.1	901	63%	75%
Loxodonta africana	African savanna elephant	Afrotheria	99	XP_010593357.1	907	65%	79%
Choloepus didactylus	Southern two-toed sloth	Xenarthra	99	XP_037662834.1	855	64%	78%
Vombatus ursinus	Common wombat	Marsupialia	160	XP_027724161.1	857	50%	67%
Antechinus flavipes	Yellow-footed antechinus	Marsupialia	160	XP_051854920.1	798	51%	70%

Interestingly, MROH9 orthologs were observed to only be found in mammalian species, as seen in the table. Absolutely no homologs or orthologs were found in any birds, reptiles, amphibians, invertebrates, fungi, plants, or bacteria. Orthologs could be found in every extant mammalian species with the exception of Monotremes, which only showed homologs for different isoforms and various paralogs. It also appears that there is no direct correlation between estimated date of divergence and sequence similarity with humans; orthologs found in animals in the Glires taxon (which diverged most recently in mammals) showed less similarity to the human MROH9 sequence compared to mammal groups that diverged longer ago.

=== Paralog ===
Table 3: Orthologs of the human MROH7 gene (a paralog to MROH9), in various mammals.
**Scientific name**	**Common name**	**Taxon**	**median date of divergence (MYA)**	**Accession #**	**Length (amino acids)**	**% identity to humans**	**% similarity to humans**
Homo sapiens	Human	Primates	0	KAI2517273.1	898	100%	100%
Ochotona curzoniae	Black-lipped pika	Glires	87	XP_040834542.1	1311	87%	92%
Hyaena hyaena	Striped hyena	Carnivora	94	XP_039095139.1	1319	87%	92%
Equus asinus	Ass	Perissodactyla	94	XP_014699852.1	1325	87%	93%

MROH7 is a notable paralog of the MROH9 gene and is found in humans as well as some other select mammal species. The second table above shows some of these paralogs and their sequence identity and similarity to the human MROH7 gene. Human MROH7 was found to have a 22% shared sequence identity to the human MROH9 gene.

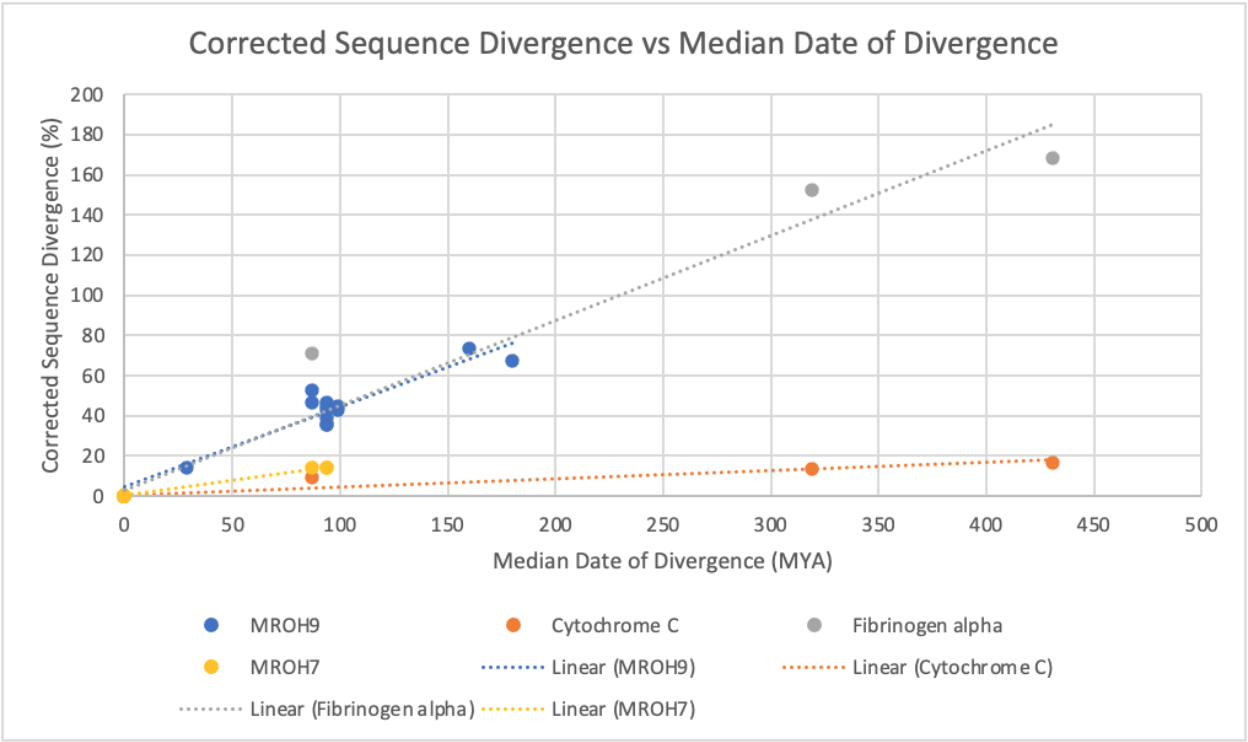
Graph plotting the corrected sequence divergence and median date of divergence for MROH9, MROH7, cytochrome C, and fibrinogen alpha in humans and orthologous species.

The graph to the right shows the corrected sequence divergence versus median date of divergence of MROH9. Plotted with the rate of evolution of MROH9 are rates for fibrinogen alpha (a rapidly evolving gene), cytochrome C (a slowly evolving gene), and the MROH7 paralog. The graph shows that the slope for MROH7 evolution is much lower than MROH9, with its rate of divergence being almost similar to that of cytochrome C. All of the orthologs of the MROH7 gene show the same sequence identity despite having diverged at different times in history. This could imply that the orthologs for the MROH7 gene are closer related together, and might have diverged from MROH9 roughly 94 million years ago and did not evolve much since then. It is also possible that the MROH7 paralog is evolving slower than the MROH9 gene.

== Interacting proteins ==
Both GLO1 and RNF123 appear in several databases and articles, heightening the possibility of these being genuine interacting proteins for MROH9. RNF123 and PARK2, another interacting protein, are both E3 Ubiquitin ligases, which are responsible for targeting proteins for degradation. GLO1, or lactoylglutathione ligase, is an enzyme catalyzing isomerization of hemithioacetal adducts. These results explain that MROH9 function may depend on the activity of these ligases and might be degraded.

== Clinical significance ==
MROH9 appears in several publications indicating its potential role as an oncogene in various types of cancers. One paper found that there was excessive chromatin looping near MROH9 and several FMO genes (gene neighbors to MROH9 on chromosome 1), along with other key oncogenes in nasopharyngeal cancer, potentially linking MROH9 with oncogene properties. MROH9 has also been found to play roles as an oncogene in other forms of cancer; studies have found it to be a potential necroptosis-related gene that is overexpressed in high-risk groups for pancreatic adenocarcinoma. MROH9 has been further confirmed by some studies as an oncogene for breast cancers, with alterations in chromosome 1 being described in over half of breast cancer tumors. A large number of copy number variations (CNVs) are particularly found on the 1q arm of chromosome 1 where MROH9 is found. Other research found MROH9 to be a predicted target of miR-3646, a type of microRNA that promotes cell proliferation in human breast cancer cells. In addition to this, MROH9 is also found at a chromosome 1 locus that is associated with central corneal thickness, a measure of glaucoma. It is found at the associated locus together with PRRX1, another gene that, along with MROH9, was also found to be an associated variant in systemic lupus erythematosus
