= CIDEB =

Protein-coding gene in humans

Identifiers
- Aliases: CIDEB, cell death-inducing DFFA-like effector b, cell death inducing DFFA like effector b
- External IDs: OMIM: 604441; MGI: 1270844; GeneCards: CIDEB
Available structures
PDB	Ortholog search: PDBe RCSB
PDB	List of PDB id codes 1D4B

Gene location (Human)
Chr.	Chromosome 14 (human)
Band	14q12	Start	24,305,096 bp
Band	14q12	End	24,311,430 bp

Gene location (Mouse)
Chr.	Chromosome 14 (mouse)
Band	14|14 C3	Start	55,991,507 bp
Band	14|14 C3	End	55,995,915 bp
RNA expression pattern
Bgee	Human / Mouse (ortholog); Top expressed in: right lobe of liver; duodenum; spleen; granulocyte; monocyte; blood; mucosa of esophagus; human kidney; left adrenal cortex; right adrenal gland / Top expressed in: right kidney; jejunum; human kidney; duodenum; left lobe of liver; ileum; proximal tubule; intestinal villus; epithelium of small intestine; colon; More reference expression data
BioGPS	n/a
Gene ontology
Molecular function	protein binding; identical protein binding
Cellular component	perinuclear region of cytoplasm; cytosol; lipid droplet; intracellular anatomical structure
Biological process	positive regulation of release of cytochrome c from mitochondria; execution phase of apoptosis; activation of cysteine-type endopeptidase activity; positive regulation of cell death; intrinsic apoptotic signaling pathway in response to DNA damage; apoptotic process
Sources:Amigo / QuickGO
Orthologs
Databases	NCBI: entry; OMA: entry
Species	Human	Mouse
Entrez	27141	12684
Ensembl	ENSG00000136305; ENSG00000285199	ENSMUSG00000022219
UniProt	Q9UHD4	O70303
RefSeq (mRNA)	NM_014430; NM_001318807	NM_009894; NM_026804
RefSeq (protein)	NP_001305736; NP_055245	NP_034024
Location (UCSC)	Chr 14: 24.31 – 24.31 Mb	Chr 14: 55.99 – 56 Mb
PubMed search
- Wikidata
View/Edit Human	View/Edit Mouse

Cell death-inducing DFFA-like effector b, also known as CIDEB, is a human gene.

In humans, individuals carrying rare loss of function mutations in the CIDEB gene are protected against different aetiologies of liver disease. CIDEB knockout mice have been generated by homolog recombination technique. The CIDE null mice show decreased lipogenesis. The CIDEB knockout mice are resistant to high fat diet induced obesity and liver steatosis. In addition, the CIDEB null mice also have improved insulin sensitivity and enhanced hepatic fatty acid oxidation and whole body metabolism. CIDEB plays a key role in determining lipid droplet size: overexpression of CIDEB in vitro results in fat accumulation by inducing larger lipid droplets, while CIDEB knock-out experiments results in accumulation of smaller lipid droplets.
