= SARM1 =

Protein-coding gene in the species Homo sapiens

Identifiers
- Aliases: SARM1, MyD88-5, SAMD2, SARM, sterile alpha and TIR motif containing 1, hHsTIR
- External IDs: OMIM: 607732; MGI: 2136419; GeneCards: SARM1
Enzyme activity
EC #	BRENDA	ExPASy	KEGG	MetaCyc
3.2.2.6	↗	↗	↗	↗

Gene location (Human)
Chr.	Chromosome 17 (human)
Band	17q11.2	Start	28,364,356 bp
Band	17q11.2	End	28,404,049 bp

Gene location (Mouse)
Chr.	Chromosome 11 (mouse)
Band	11 B5|11 46.74 cM	Start	78,363,156 bp
Band	11 B5|11 46.74 cM	End	78,388,580 bp
RNA expression pattern
Bgee	Human / Mouse (ortholog); Top expressed in: body of pancreas; islet of Langerhans; ganglionic eminence; ventricular zone; anterior pituitary; granulocyte; right uterine tube; stromal cell of endometrium; right adrenal gland; body of uterus / Top expressed in: superior cervical ganglion; neural layer of retina; stellate ganglion; dentate gyrus of hippocampal formation granule cell; spinal ganglia; thoracic ganglia; neural tube; ganglionic eminence; visual cortex; primary visual cortex; More reference expression data
BioGPS	n/a
Gene ontology
Molecular function	protein binding; signaling adaptor activity
Cellular component	cytoplasm; cytosol; cell projection; microtubule cytoskeleton; synapse; extrinsic component of mitochondrial outer membrane; axon; cell junction; mitochondrion; microtubule; dendrite
Biological process	regulation of apoptotic process; cell differentiation; immune system process; response to glucose; nervous system development; regulation of dendrite morphogenesis; negative regulation of MyD88-independent toll-like receptor signaling pathway; innate immune response; signal transduction; regulation of neuron death; positive regulation of signal transduction; response to axon injury
Sources:Amigo / QuickGO
Orthologs
Databases	NCBI: entry; OMA: entry
Species	Human	Mouse
Entrez	23098	237868
Ensembl	ENSG00000004139	ENSMUSG00000050132
UniProt	Q6SZW1; Q0D2N8	Q6PDS3
RefSeq (mRNA)	NM_015077	NM_001168521; NM_172795
RefSeq (protein)	NP_055892; NP_055892.2	NP_001161993; NP_766383
Location (UCSC)	Chr 17: 28.36 – 28.4 Mb	Chr 11: 78.36 – 78.39 Mb
PubMed search
- Wikidata
View/Edit Human	View/Edit Mouse

Sterile alpha and TIR motif containing 1 Is an enzyme that in humans is encoded by the SARM1 gene. It is the most evolutionarily conserved member of the Toll/Interleukin receptor-1 (TIR) family. SARM1's TIR domain has intrinsic NADase enzymatic activity that is highly conserved from archaea, plants, nematode worms, fruit flies, and humans. In mammals, SARM1 is highly expressed in neurons, where it resides in both cell bodies and axons, and can be associated with mitochondria.

== Function ==
While SARM1 has been studied as a Toll-like receptor adaptor protein in an immune context, its most well-studied function in mammals is as a sensor of metabolic stress and an executioner of neuronal cell body and axon death. Because SARM1 is highly expressed in the nervous system, most studies of SARM1 focus on neuron degeneration, but some SARM1 can be found in other tissues, notably macrophages and T cells. By generating cADPR or NAADP, SARM1 may function as a Ca^{2+}-signaling enzyme similar to CD38.

== Regulation of enzymatic activity ==
SARM1's TIR domain is a multi-functional NAD(P)ase enzyme capable of hydrolyzing NAD^{+} or NADP, cyclizing NAD^{+} or NADP to form cADPR or cADPRP, and transglycosidation (base exchange) of NAD^{+} or NADP with free pyridines to form molecules such as NAADP. For NAD^{+}, the transglycosidation (base exchange) activity of SARM1 extends beyond simple pyridines and includes many heterocyclic nucleophilic bases.

SARM1's enzymatic activity can be regulated at the TIR domain orthosteric site by naturally occurring metabolites such as nicotinamide, NADP, and nicotinic acid riboside. Non-endogenous small chemical molecules have also been shown to inhibit SARM1's enzymatic activity at or near the orthosteric site.

In addition, SARM1's enzymatic activity can be regulated by its allosteric site at the ARM domain, which can bind to NMN or NAD^{+}. The ratio of NMN/NAD^{+} in cells determines SARM1's enzymatic activity. A chemically-modified cell permeable version of NMN, CZ-48, likely activates SARM1 via interacting with this allosteric region. Two long-studied neurotoxins, Vacor and 3-acetylpyridine, cause neurodegeneration by activating SARM1. Both Vacor and 3-acetylpyridine can be modified by NAMPT to become their mononucleotide versions (Vacor-MN or 3-AP-MN) that bind to SARM1's allosteric ARM domain region and activate its TIR domain NADase activity. When NAD^{+} levels are low, nicotinic acid mononucleotide (NaMN) can bind to the allosteric region and inhibit SARM1 activity, thus explaining the potent axon protection provided by treating neurons with the NaMN precursor nicotinic acid riboside (NaR) while inhibiting NAMPT. Chemical screening approaches have also identified covalent inhibitors of SARM1's allosteric ARM domain region.

Other pro-degeneration signaling pathways, such as the MAP kinase pathway, have been linked to SARM1 activation. MAPK signaling has been shown to promote the loss of NMNAT2, thereby promoting SARM1 activation. SARM1 activation also triggers the MAP kinase cascade, indicating some form of feedback loop may exist.

== Relevance to human disease ==
Possible implications of the SARM1 pathway with regard to human health may be found in animal models of neurodegeneration, where loss of SARM1 is neuroprotective in models of traumatic brain injury, chemotherapy-induced neuropathy, diabetic neuropathy, degenerative eye conditions, drug-induced Schwann cell death, Charcot-Marie-Tooth disease, and hereditary spastic paraplegia.

Loss-of-function alleles of the SARM1 gene also occur naturally in the human population, potentially altering susceptibility to various neurological conditions.

Specific mutations in the human NMNAT2 gene, encoding a key regulator of SARM1 activity, have linked the Wallerian degeneration mechanism to two human neurological diseases - fetal akinesia deformation sequence and childhood-onset polyneuropathy with erythromelalgia. Mutations in the human SARM1 gene that result in SARM1 protein with constitutive NADase activity have been reported in patients with amyotrophic lateral sclerosis (ALS).

=== Wallerian degeneration pathway ===
SARM1 protein plays a central role in the Wallerian degeneration pathway. The role for this gene in the Wallerian degeneration pathway was first identified in a Drosophila melanogaster mutagenesis screen, and subsequently genetic knockout of its homologue in mice showed robust protection of transected axons comparable to that of Wld^{S} mutation (a mouse mutation resulting in delayed Wallerian degeneration). Loss of SARM1 in human iPSC-derived neurons is also axon protective.

The SARM1 protein has a mitochondrial localization signal, an auto-inhibitory N-terminus region consisting of armadillo (ARM)/HEAT motifs, two sterile alpha motif domains (SAM) responsible for multimerization, and a C-terminal Toll/Interleukin-1 receptor (TIR) domain that possesses enzymatic activity. The functional unit of SARM1 is an octameric ring. In healthy neurons, SARM1's enzyme activity is mostly autoinhibited through intramolecular and intermolecular interactions between ARM-ARM, ARM-SAM and ARM-TIR domains, as well as interactions between a duplex of octameric rings.

SARM1's enzymatic activity is critically tuned to the activity of another axonal enzyme, NMNAT2. NMNAT2 is a labile protein in axons and is rapidly degraded after axon injury. NMNAT2 is a transferase that uses ATP to convert nicotinamide mononucleotide (NMN) into NAD^{+}. Remarkably, genetic loss of NMNAT2 in mice leads to embryonic lethality that can be fully rescued by genetic loss of SARM1, indicating that SARM1 acts downstream of NMNAT2. Thus, when NMNAT2 is degraded after axon injury, SARM1 is activated. Conversely, overexpression of the Wld^{S} protein (which contains functional NMNAT1), axon-targeted NMNAT1, or NMNAT2 itself can protect axons and keep SARM1 from being activated. These findings lead to the hypothesis and subsequent demonstration that NMNAT2's substrate NMN, which should increase when NMNAT2 is degraded after injury, can promote axon degeneration via SARM1. Further studies revealed that NMN could activate SARM1's enzymatic activity. Through a combination of structural, biochemical, biophysical, and cellular assays, it was revealed that SARM1 is tuned to NMNAT activity by sensing the ratio of NMN/NAD^{+}. This ratio is sensed by an allosteric region in SARM1's ARM domain region that can bind either NMN or NAD^{+}. NAD^{+} binding is associated with SARM1's auto-inhibited state, while NMN binding to the allosteric region results in a conformational change in the ARM domain that allows for multimerization of SARM1's TIR domains and enzymatic activation.

SARM1 activation locally triggers a rapid collapse of NAD^{+} levels in the distal section of the injured axon, which then undergoes degeneration. This collapse in NAD^{+} levels was later shown to be due to SARM1's TIR domain having intrinsic NAD^{+} cleavage activity. SARM1 can hydrolyze NAD^{+} into nicotinamide and adenosine diphosphate ribose (ADPR), generate cyclic ADPR (cADPR), or mediate a base-exchange reaction with ADPR and free pyridine-ring containing bases, like nicotinamide. Activation of SARM1's NADase activity is necessary and sufficient to collapse NAD^{+} levels and initiate the Wallerian degeneration pathway. NAD^{+} loss is followed by depletion of ATP, defects in mitochondrial movement and depolarization, calcium influx, externalization of phosphatidylserine, and loss of membrane permeability prior to catastrophic axonal self-destruction.

SARM1 activation due to loss of NMNAT2 in neurons also elicits a pro-degenerative neuroinflammatory response from peripheral nervous system macrophages and central nervous system astrocytes and microglia.
