= SFXN1 =

Protein-coding gene in the species Homo sapiens

Identifiers
- Aliases: SFXN1, TCC, sideroflexin 1, SLC56A1
- External IDs: OMIM: 615569; MGI: 2137677; GeneCards: SFXN1

Gene location (Human)
Chr.	Chromosome 5 (human)
Band	5q35.2	Start	175,477,062 bp
Band	5q35.2	End	175,529,742 bp

Gene location (Mouse)
Chr.	Chromosome 13 (mouse)
Band	13 B1|13 28.4 cM	Start	54,225,888 bp
Band	13 B1|13 28.4 cM	End	54,262,361 bp
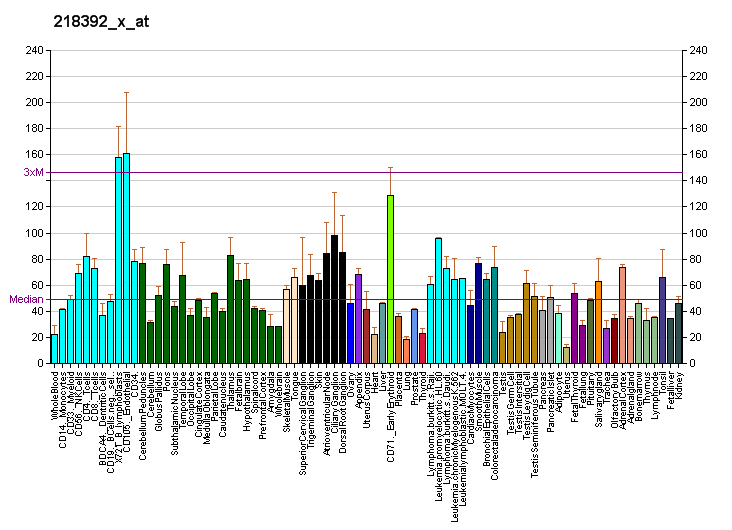
RNA expression pattern
Bgee	Human / Mouse (ortholog); Top expressed in: amniotic fluid; buccal mucosa cell; ventricular zone; liver; stromal cell of endometrium; right lobe of liver; ganglionic eminence; kidney tubule; endothelial cell; tendon of biceps brachii / Top expressed in: tunica adventitia of aorta; crypt of lieberkuhn of small intestine; human kidney; brown adipose tissue; right kidney; lacrimal gland; white adipose tissue; intestinal villus; left lobe of liver; parotid gland; More reference expression data
BioGPS	More reference expression data
Gene ontology
Molecular function	ion transmembrane transporter activity; L-serine transmembrane transporter activity; D-serine transmembrane transporter activity
Cellular component	integral component of membrane; membrane; mitochondrion; mitochondrial membranes; integral component of mitochondrial inner membrane; mitochondrial inner membrane
Biological process	erythrocyte differentiation; ion transmembrane transport; iron ion homeostasis; iron ion transport; ion transport; transmembrane transport; one-carbon metabolic process; L-serine transport; D-serine transport; serine import into mitochondrion; amino acid transport
Sources:Amigo / QuickGO
Orthologs
Databases	NCBI: entry; OMA: entry
Species	Human	Mouse
Entrez	94081	14057
Ensembl	ENSG00000164466	ENSMUSG00000021474
UniProt	Q9H9B4	Q99JR1
RefSeq (mRNA)	NM_022754; NM_001322977; NM_001322978; NM_001322980; NM_001322981 NM_001322982; NM_001322983	NM_027324
RefSeq (protein)	NP_001309906; NP_001309907; NP_001309909; NP_001309910; NP_001309911 NP_001309912; NP_073591	NP_081600
Location (UCSC)	Chr 5: 175.48 – 175.53 Mb	Chr 13: 54.23 – 54.26 Mb
PubMed search
- Wikidata
View/Edit Human	View/Edit Mouse

Sideroflexin-1 is a protein that in humans is encoded by the SFXN1 gene. According to Nora Kory et al., SFXN1 gene product has mitochondrial serine transporter activity.
