= NADSYN1 =

Protein-coding gene in humans

Identifiers
- Aliases: NADSYN1, NAD synthetase 1, VCRL3
- External IDs: OMIM: 608285; MGI: 1926164; HomoloGene: 6098; GeneCards: NADSYN1; OMA:NADSYN1 - orthologs

Gene location (Human)
| Chr. | Chromosome 11 (human) |
| Band | 11q13.4 | Start | 71,453,109 bp |
| Band | 11q13.4 | End | 71,524,107 bp |

Gene location (Mouse)
| Chr. | Chromosome 7 (mouse) |
| Band | 7|7 F5 | Start | 143,349,321 bp |
| Band | 7|7 F5 | End | 143,376,586 bp |
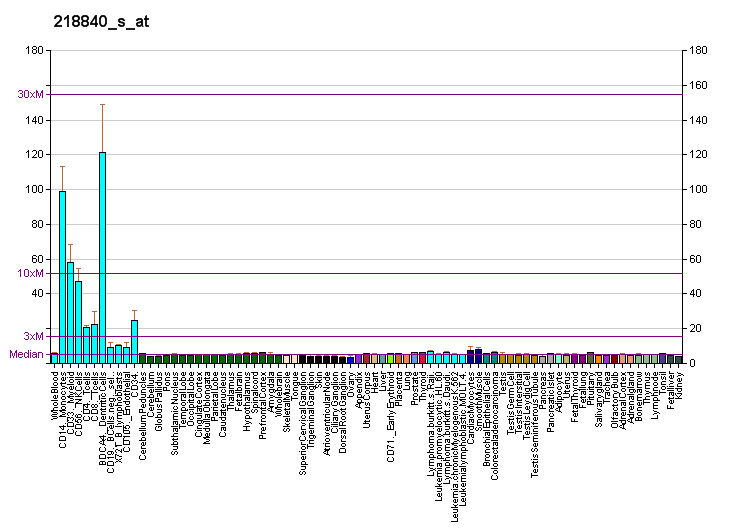
RNA expression pattern
| Bgee | Human / Mouse (ortholog); Top expressed in: right uterine tube; granulocyte; mucosa of transverse colon; anterior pituitary; minor salivary glands; left ovary; right lung; skin of leg; rectum; body of stomach / Top expressed in: duodenum; jejunum; proximal tubule; yolk sac; right kidney; left lobe of liver; epithelium of small intestine; colon; ileum; human kidney; More reference expression data |
| BioGPS | More reference expression data |
Gene ontology
| Molecular function | nucleotide binding; ligase activity; protein binding; ATP binding; glutaminase activity; NAD+ synthase (glutamine-hydrolyzing) activity |
| Cellular component | cytoplasm; cytosol |
| Biological process | nitrogen compound metabolic process; NAD metabolic process; NAD biosynthetic process |
Sources:Amigo / QuickGO
Orthologs
| Species | Human | Mouse |
| Entrez | 55191 | 78914 |
| Ensembl | ENSG00000172890 | ENSMUSG00000031090 |
| UniProt | Q6IA69 | Q711T7 |
| RefSeq (mRNA) | NM_018161 | NM_030221; NM_001308092; NM_001308095 |
| RefSeq (protein) | NP_060631 | NP_001295024; NP_084497 |
| Location (UCSC) | Chr 11: 71.45 – 71.52 Mb | Chr 7: 143.35 – 143.38 Mb |
| PubMed search |
- Wikidata
| View/Edit Human | View/Edit Mouse |

Glutamine-dependent NAD(+) synthetase is an enzyme that in humans is encoded by the NADSYN1 gene.

Nicotinamide adenine dinucleotide (NAD) is a coenzyme in metabolic redox reactions, a precursor for several cell signaling molecules, and a substrate for protein posttranslational modifications. NAD synthetase (EC 6.3.5.1) catalyzes the final step in the biosynthesis of NAD from nicotinic acid adenine dinucleotide (NaAD).
