= NMNAT2 =

Protein-coding gene in humans

Identifiers
- Aliases: NMNAT2, C1orf15, PNAT2, nicotinamide nucleotide adenylyltransferase 2
- External IDs: OMIM: 608701; MGI: 2444155; GeneCards: NMNAT2
Enzyme activity
EC #	BRENDA	ExPASy	KEGG	MetaCyc
2.7.7.1	↗	↗	↗	↗
2.7.7.18	↗	↗	↗	↗

Gene location (Human)
Chr.	Chromosome 1 (human)
Band	1q25.3	Start	183,248,237 bp
Band	1q25.3	End	183,418,380 bp

Gene location (Mouse)
Chr.	Chromosome 1 (mouse)
Band	1|1 G3	Start	152,830,744 bp
Band	1|1 G3	End	152,995,007 bp
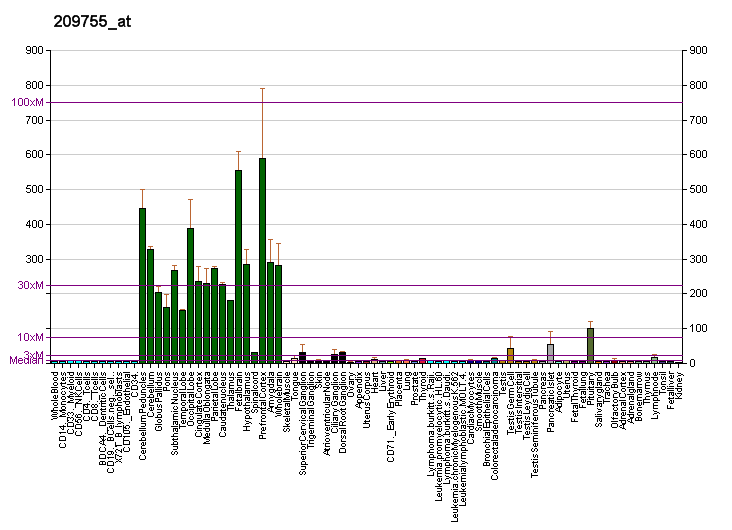
RNA expression pattern
Bgee	Human / Mouse (ortholog); Top expressed in: middle temporal gyrus; frontal pole; paraflocculus of cerebellum; Brodmann area 10; orbitofrontal cortex; cerebellar vermis; Brodmann area 23; right hemisphere of cerebellum; Brodmann area 46; superior frontal gyrus / Top expressed in: medial dorsal nucleus; cerebellar cortex; visual cortex; superior cervical ganglion; dentate gyrus of hippocampal formation granule cell; central gray substance of midbrain; dorsomedial hypothalamic nucleus; lateral geniculate nucleus; primary visual cortex; cerebellar vermis; More reference expression data
BioGPS	More reference expression data
Gene ontology
Molecular function	transferase activity; nucleotide binding; nucleotidyltransferase activity; catalytic activity; nicotinamide-nucleotide adenylyltransferase activity; ATP binding; nicotinate-nucleotide adenylyltransferase activity
Cellular component	cytoplasm; Golgi membrane; late endosome; Golgi apparatus; trans-Golgi network; synapse; membrane; axon; cytoplasmic vesicle membrane; cytoplasmic vesicle; cell projection
Biological process	pyridine nucleotide biosynthetic process; NAD metabolic process; biosynthesis; NAD biosynthetic process; 'de novo' NAD biosynthetic process from aspartate; nucleotide biosynthetic process
Sources:Amigo / QuickGO
Orthologs
Databases	NCBI: entry; OMA: entry
Species	Human	Mouse
Entrez	23057	226518
Ensembl	ENSG00000157064	ENSMUSG00000042751
UniProt	Q9BZQ4	Q8BNJ3
RefSeq (mRNA)	NM_170706; NM_015039	NM_175460
RefSeq (protein)	NP_055854; NP_733820	NP_780669
Location (UCSC)	Chr 1: 183.25 – 183.42 Mb	Chr 1: 152.83 – 153 Mb
PubMed search
- Wikidata
View/Edit Human	View/Edit Mouse

Nicotinamide mononucleotide adenylyltransferase 2 (NMNAT2) is an enzyme that in humans is encoded by the NMNAT2 gene.

This gene product belongs to the nicotinamide-nucleotide adenylyltransferase (NMNAT) enzyme family, members of which catalyze an essential step in the nicotinamide adenine dinucleotide (NAD+ (NADP)) biosynthetic pathway. NMNAT2 is cytoplasmic (associated with the Golgi apparatus), and is predominantly expressed in the brain. Two transcript variants encoding different isoforms have been found for this gene.

adenosine triphosphate
+
nicotinamide mononucleotide
PP_{i}
PP_{i}
nicotinamide adenine dinucleotide

Loss of NMNAT2 initiates Wallerian degeneration. By contrast, NMNAT2 enhancement opposes the actions of SARM1 which would lead to axon degeneration, but this effect is not due to preventing SARM1 depletion of NAD+. Mice lacking NMNAT2 die before birth, but are completely rescued by SARM1 deletion. Activation of NMNAT2 by Sirtuin 3 (SIRT3) may be a means of inhibiting axon degeneration and dysfunction.

The catechin epigallocatechin gallate (EGCG) found in tea can activate NMNAT2 by more than 100%.
