= COX18, cytochrome c oxidase assembly factor =

Protein-coding gene in the species Homo sapiens

COX18

Identifiers
- Aliases: COX18, COX18HS, COX18 cytochrome c oxidase assembly factor, cytochrome c oxidase assembly factor, cytochrome c oxidase assembly factor COX18
- External IDs: OMIM: 610428; MGI: 2448532; HomoloGene: 14821; GeneCards: COX18; OMA:COX18 - orthologs

Gene location (Human)
Chr.	Chromosome 4 (human)
Band	4q13.3	Start	73,052,362 bp
Band	4q13.3	End	73,069,755 bp

Gene location (Mouse)
Chr.	Chromosome 5 (mouse)
Band	5|5 E1	Start	90,362,583 bp
Band	5|5 E1	End	90,371,860 bp
RNA expression pattern
Bgee	Human / Mouse (ortholog); Top expressed in: tibia; retinal pigment epithelium; jejunal mucosa; oral cavity; skin of arm; germinal epithelium; myocardium of left ventricle; bronchial epithelial cell; corpus epididymis; palpebral conjunctiva / Top expressed in: renal corpuscle; lactiferous gland; medullary collecting duct; entorhinal cortex; Ileal epithelium; perirhinal cortex; endocardial cushion; left lobe of liver; secondary oocyte; choroid plexus of fourth ventricle; More reference expression data
BioGPS	n/a
Gene ontology
Molecular function	protein binding; membrane insertase activity
Cellular component	integral component of membrane; mitochondrial inner membrane; membrane; mitochondrion; integral component of mitochondrial inner membrane
Biological process	respiratory chain complex IV assembly; protein insertion into mitochondrial membrane; protein transport; protein insertion into mitochondrial inner membrane from matrix; mitochondrial cytochrome c oxidase assembly; protein insertion into membrane
Sources:Amigo / QuickGO
Orthologs
Species	Human	Mouse
Entrez	285521	231430
Ensembl	ENSG00000163626	ENSMUSG00000035505
UniProt	Q8N8Q8	Q8VC74
RefSeq (mRNA)	NM_001033760; NM_001297732; NM_001297733; NM_001300729; NM_173827	NM_001033310; NM_001163456
RefSeq (protein)	NP_001284661; NP_001284662; NP_001287658; NP_776188	NP_001028482; NP_001156928
Location (UCSC)	Chr 4: 73.05 – 73.07 Mb	Chr 5: 90.36 – 90.37 Mb
PubMed search
- Wikidata
View/Edit Human	View/Edit Mouse

COX18, cytochrome c oxidase assembly factor is a protein that in humans is encoded by the COX18 gene.

== Function ==
This gene encodes a cytochrome c oxidase assembly protein. The encoded protein is essential for integral membrane protein insertion into the mitochondrial inner membrane. It is also required for cytochrome c oxidase assembly and activity. Alternative splicing results in multiple transcript variants. [provided by RefSeq, Jul 2014].
