= Cytochrome c oxidase subunit 2 =

Enzyme of the respiratory chain encoded by a mitochondrial gene

COX2

Identifiers
- Aliases: COX2, mitochondrially encoded cytochrome c oxidase II, COII, MTCO2, Cytochrome c oxidase subunit II, CO II
- External IDs: OMIM: 516040; MGI: 102503; GeneCards: COX2
Available structures
| PDB | Ortholog search: PDBe RCSB |
| PDB | List of PDB id codes 3VRJ |
Enzyme activity
| EC # | BRENDA | ExPASy | KEGG | MetaCyc |
|---|---|---|---|---|
| 7.1.1.9 | ↗ | ↗ | ↗ | ↗ |
Gene location (Human)
| Chr. | Mitochondrial DNA (human) |
| Band | n/a | Start | 7,586 bp |
| Band | n/a | End | 8,269 bp |
Gene location (Mouse)
| Chr. | Mitochondrial DNA (mouse) |
| Band | n/a | Start | 7,013 bp |
| Band | n/a | End | 7,696 bp |
RNA expression pattern
| Bgee | Human / Mouse (ortholog); Top expressed in: mucosa of transverse colon; putamen; caudate nucleus; right frontal lobe; nucleus accumbens; right hemisphere of cerebellum; hippocampus proper; substantia nigra; muscle layer of sigmoid colon; hypothalamus / Top expressed in: ventricular zone; dentate gyrus of hippocampal formation granule cell; esophagus; zone of skin; ovary; epiblast; jejunum; right kidney; proximal tubule; duodenum; More reference expression data |
| BioGPS | n/a |
Gene ontology
| Molecular function | protein binding; metal ion binding; copper ion binding; oxidoreductase activity; cytochrome-c oxidase activity |
| Cellular component | respiratory chain complex IV; respirasome; integral component of membrane; mitochondrion; membrane; extracellular exosome; mitochondrial respiratory chain complex IV; mitochondrial inner membrane |
| Biological process | electron transport chain; response to cold; lactation; proton transmembrane transport; mitochondrial electron transport, cytochrome c to oxygen; ATP synthesis coupled electron transport; positive regulation of hydrogen peroxide biosynthetic process; positive regulation of necrotic cell death; positive regulation of ATP biosynthetic process |
Sources:Amigo / QuickGO
Orthologs
| Databases | NCBI: entry; OMA: entry |
| Species | Human | Mouse |
| Entrez | 4513 | 17709 |
| Ensembl | ENSG00000198712 | ENSMUSG00000064354 |
| UniProt | P00403 | P00405 |
| RefSeq (mRNA) | n/a | n/a |
| RefSeq (protein) | n/a | NP_904331 |
| Location (UCSC) | Chr M: 0.01 – 0.01 Mb | Chr M: 0.01 – 0.01 Mb |
| PubMed search |
- Wikidata
| View/Edit Human | View/Edit Mouse |

Location of the MT-CO2 gene in the human mitochondrial genome. MT-CO2 is one of the three cytochrome c oxidase subunit mitochondrial genes (orange boxes).

Cytochrome c oxidase subunit II, transmembrane domain
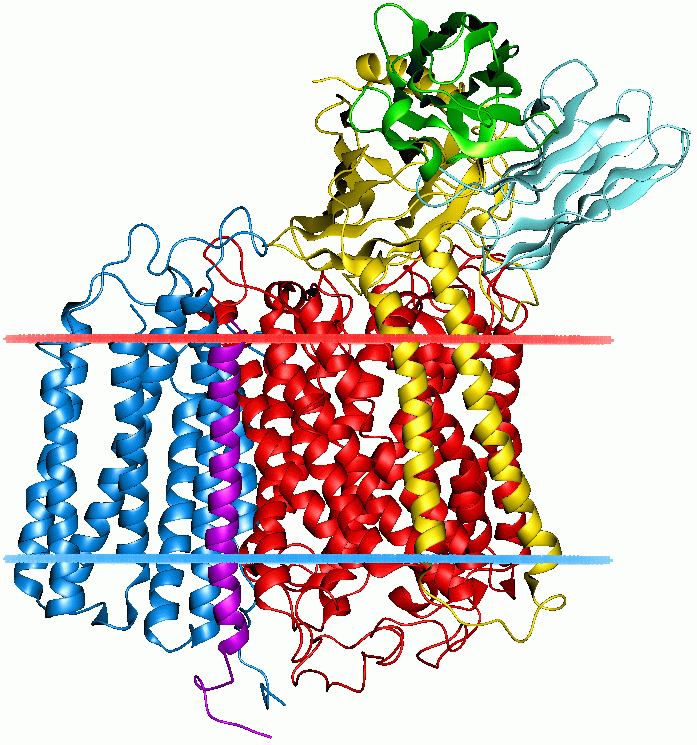
- Bacterial cytochrome c oxidase complex. Subunit II indicated by blue.

Identifiers
- Symbol: COX2_TM
- Pfam: PF02790
- InterPro: IPR011759
- PROSITE: PDOC00075
- SCOP2: 1occ / SCOPe / SUPFAM
- TCDB: 3.D.4
- OPM superfamily: 4
- OPM protein: 1v55
Available protein structures:
- PDB: IPR011759 PF02790 (ECOD; PDBsum)
- AlphaFold: IPR011759; PF02790

Cytochrome C oxidase subunit II, periplasmic domain

Identifiers
- Symbol: COX2
- Pfam: PF00116
- InterPro: IPR002429
- CDD: cd13912
Available protein structures:
- PDB: IPR002429 PF00116 (ECOD; PDBsum)
- AlphaFold: IPR002429; PF00116

Cytochrome c oxidase II is a protein in eukaryotes that is encoded by the MT-CO2 gene. Cytochrome c oxidase subunit II, abbreviated COXII, COX2, COII, or MT-CO2, is the second subunit of cytochrome c oxidase. It is also one of the three mitochondrial DNA (mtDNA) encoded subunits (MT-CO1, MT-CO2, MT-CO3) of respiratory complex IV.

== Structure ==
In humans, the MT-CO2 gene is located on the p arm of mitochondrial DNA at position 12 and it spans 683 base pairs. The MT-CO2 gene produces a 25.6 kDa protein composed of 227 amino acids. MT-CO2 is a subunit of the enzyme Cytochrome c oxidase (EC 1.9.3.1) (Complex IV), an oligomeric enzymatic complex of the mitochondrial respiratory chain involved in the transfer of electrons from cytochrome c to oxygen. In eukaryotes this enzyme complex is located in the mitochondrial inner membrane; in aerobic prokaryotes it is found in the plasma membrane. The enzyme complex consists of 3-4 subunits (prokaryotes) to up to 13 polypeptides (mammals). The N-terminal domain of cytochrome C oxidase contains two transmembrane alpha-helices. The structure of MT-CO2 is known to contain one redox center and a binuclear copper A center (CuA). The CuA is located in a conserved cysteine loop at 196 and 200 amino acid positions and conserved histidine at 204. Several bacterial MT-CO2 have a C-terminal extension that contains a covalently bound haem c.

== Function ==
The MT-CO2 gene encodes for the second subunit of cytochrome c oxidase (complex IV), a component of the mitochondrial respiratory chain that catalyzes the reduction of oxygen to water. MT-CO2 is one of the three subunits which are responsible for the formation of the functional core of the cytochrome c oxidase. MT-CO2 plays an essential role in the transfer of electrons from cytochrome c to the bimetallic center of the catalytic subunit 1 by utilizing its binuclear copper A center. It contains two adjacent transmembrane regions in its N-terminus and the major part of the protein is exposed to the periplasmic or to the mitochondrial intermembrane space, respectively. MT-CO2 provides the substrate-binding site and contains the binuclear copper A center, probably the primary acceptor in cytochrome c oxidase.

== Clinical significance ==
=== Mitochondrial complex IV deficiency ===
Variants of MT-CO2 have been associated with the mitochondrial Complex IV deficiency, a deficiency in an enzyme complex of the mitochondrial respiratory chain that catalyzes the oxidation of cytochrome c utilizing molecular oxygen. The deficiency is characterized by heterogeneous phenotypes ranging from isolated myopathy to severe multisystem disease affecting several tissues and organs. Other Clinical Manifestations include hypertrophic cardiomyopathy, hepatomegaly and liver dysfunction, hypotonia, muscle weakness, exercise intolerance, developmental disability, delayed motor development and mental retardation. Mutations of MT-CO2 is also known to cause Leigh's disease, which may be caused by an abnormality or deficiency of cytochrome oxidase.

A wide range of symptoms have been found in patients with pathogenic mutations in the MT-CO2 gene with the mitochondrial Complex IV deficiency. A deletion mutation of a single nucleotide (7630delT) in the gene has been found to cause symptoms of reversible aphasia, right hemiparesis, hemianopsia, exercise intolerance, progressive mental impairment, and short stature. Furthermore, a patient with a nonsense mutation (7896G>A) of the gene resulted in phenotypes such as short stature, low weight, microcephaly, skin abnormalities, severe hypotonia, and normal reflexes. A novel heteroplasmic mutation (7587T>C) which altered the initiation codon of the MT-CO2 gene in patients have shown clinical manifestations such as progressive gait ataxia, cognitive impairment, bilateral optic atrophy, pigmentary retinopathy, a decrease in color vision, and mild distal-muscle wasting.

=== Others ===
Juvenile myopathy, encephalopathy, lactic acidosis, and stroke have also been associated with mutations in the MT-CO2 gene.

== Interactions ==
MT-CO2 is known to interact with cytochrome c by the utilization of a lysine ring around the carboxyl containing heme edge of cytochrome c in MT-CO2, including glutamate 129, aspartate 132, and glutamate 19.
