= COX4I2 =

Protein-coding gene in humans

Identifiers
- Aliases: COX4I2, COX4, COX4-2, COX4B, COX4L2, COXIV-2, dJ857M17.2, cytochrome c oxidase subunit 4I2
- External IDs: OMIM: 607976; MGI: 2135755; GeneCards: COX4I2

Gene location (Human)
Chr.	Chromosome 20 (human)
Band	20q11.21	Start	31,637,912 bp
Band	20q11.21	End	31,645,006 bp

Gene location (Mouse)
Chr.	Chromosome 2 (mouse)
Band	2|2 H1	Start	152,596,093 bp
Band	2|2 H1	End	152,606,957 bp
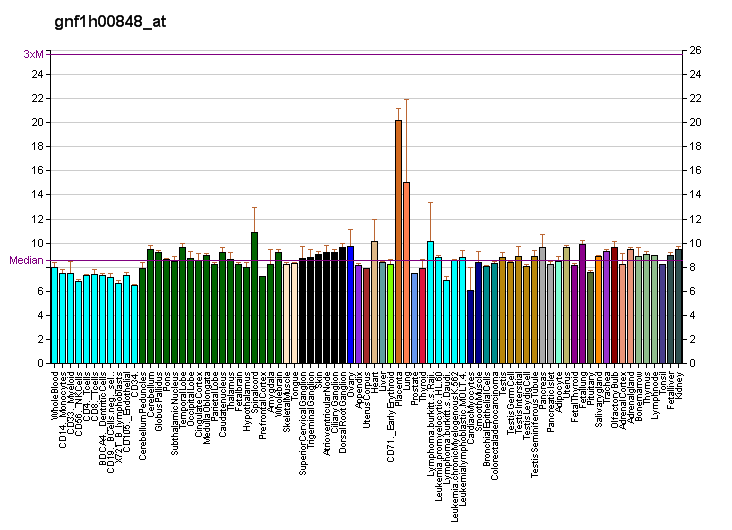
RNA expression pattern
Bgee	Human / Mouse (ortholog); Top expressed in: apex of heart; right lung; upper lobe of left lung; oocyte; left ventricle; placenta; right auricle of heart; subcutaneous adipose tissue; myocardium of left ventricle; right lobe of thyroid gland / Top expressed in: neural layer of retina; embryo; morula; genital tubercle; zygote; hair; tail of embryo; cumulus cell; embryo; molar; More reference expression data
BioGPS	More reference expression data
Gene ontology
Molecular function	cytochrome-c oxidase activity
Cellular component	mitochondrial inner membrane; membrane; mitochondrion; mitochondrial respiratory chain complex IV; mitochondrial membranes
Biological process	cellular respiration; mitochondrial electron transport, cytochrome c to oxygen; generation of precursor metabolites and energy; proton transmembrane transport; cellular response to hypoxia
Sources:Amigo / QuickGO
Orthologs
Databases	NCBI: entry; OMA: entry
Species	Human	Mouse
Entrez	84701	84682
Ensembl	ENSG00000131055	ENSMUSG00000009876
UniProt	Q96KJ9	Q91W29
RefSeq (mRNA)	NM_032609	NM_053091
RefSeq (protein)	NP_115998	NP_444321
Location (UCSC)	Chr 20: 31.64 – 31.65 Mb	Chr 2: 152.6 – 152.61 Mb
PubMed search
- Wikidata
View/Edit Human	View/Edit Mouse

Cytochrome c oxidase subunit 4 isoform 2, mitochondrial is an enzyme that in humans is encoded by the COX4I2 gene. COX4I2 is a nuclear-encoded isoform of cytochrome c oxidase (COX) subunit 4. Cytochrome c oxidase (complex IV) is a multi-subunit enzyme complex that couples the transfer of electrons from cytochrome c to molecular oxygen and contributes to a proton electrochemical gradient across the inner mitochondrial membrane, acting as the terminal enzyme of the mitochondrial respiratory chain. Mutations in COX4I2 have been associated with exocrine pancreatic insufficiency, dyserythropoietic anemia, and calvarial hyperostosis (EPIDACH).

== Structure ==
COX4I2 is located on the q arm of chromosome 20 in position 11.21 and has 6 exons. The COX4I2 gene produces a 20 kDa protein composed of 171 amino acids. The protein encoded by COX4I2 belongs to the cytochrome c oxidase IV family. COX4I2 has a transit peptide domain and a disulfide bond amino acid modification. A Glu138 residue, which corresponds to a Glu136 residue in COX4I1, is believed to be highly conserved and structurally important for the mitochondrial COX response to hypoxia.

== Function ==
Cytochrome c oxidase (COX), the terminal enzyme of the mitochondrial respiratory chain, catalyzes the electron transfer from reduced cytochrome c to oxygen. It is a heteromeric complex consisting of 3 catalytic subunits encoded by mitochondrial genes and multiple structural subunits encoded by nuclear genes. The mitochondrially-encoded subunits function in electron transfer, and the nuclear-encoded subunits may be involved in the regulation and assembly of the complex. The COX4I2 nuclear gene encodes isoform 2 of subunit IV. Isoform 1 of subunit IV is encoded by a different gene, however, the two genes show a similar structural organization. Subunit IV is the largest nuclear encoded subunit which plays a pivotal role in COX regulation. It is located on the inner mitochondrial membrane on the matrix side. Expression of COX4I2 is highest in the placenta and the lungs. Additionally, the expression of COX4I2, along with COX4I1, may be regulated by oxygen levels, with reduced levels of oxygen leading to increased COX4I2 expression and COX4I1 degradation. This suggests a role for COX4I2 in the optimization of the electron transfer chain under different conditions.

== Clinical significance ==
Mutations in COX4I2 have been associated with exocrine pancreatic insufficiency, dyserythropoeitic anemia, and calvarial hyperostosis (EPIDACH). Characteristics of this disease include pancreatic insufficiency, intestinal malabsorption, failure to thrive, and anemia soon after birth. Additional symptoms have included steatorrhea, splenomegaly and hepatomegaly, pancreatic atrophy, generalized muscle hypotonia, hyperostosis, yellowish sclera associated with mild indirect hyperbilirubinemia, impaired coagulation functions, elevated LDH, alanine, and bilirubin, and reduced vitamin E levels. A homozygous mutation, E138K, has been found to result in reduced COX4I2 expression (25% in fibroblasts) and an impaired response to hypoxia. Functional COX4I2 expression below 40% of its normal level is predicted to be rate-limiting, with the E138K mutation occurring in what is believed to be a highly conserved residue of subunit IV.

== Interactions ==
COX4I2 has been shown to interact with cytochrome c (CYCS). Additionally, APP, COA3, and KRAS have been found to have protein-protein interactions with COX4I2.
