= Burneze Geordie Girl =

West Highland White Terrier show dog

- Other name: Devon
- Species: Canis lupus familiaris
- Breed: West Highland White Terrier
- Sex: Female
- Born: 14 July 2014 (age 12); Tow Law, County Durham, England
- Title: Best In Show at Crufts (2016)
- Predecessor: Ch. McVan's To Russia With Love (Scottish Terrier)
- Successor: Sh. Ch. Afterglow Miami Ink, (American Cocker Spaniel)
- Owner: Marie Burns
- Parents: Ch. Brychdyn Diamond Geezer (sire); Ch. Burneze Plan Bea (dam)
- Official website

Burneze Geordie Girl (born 14 July 2014), also known as Devon, is a West Highland White Terrier show dog who won Best in Show at Crufts in 2016. She was bred and owned by Marie Burns.

== Background ==
Burneze Geordie Girl was bred by Marie Burns, based in Tow Law, County Durham, East England. She was sired by Ch. Brychdyn Diamond Geezer by Ch. Burneze Plan Bea. While not in the show ring, Burneze Geordie Girl is called Devon.

== Show career ==
Burneze Geordie Girl was named the Best Puppy in Show at the National Terrier Club show on 7 April 2015. A week later at the West Highland White Terrier Club of England show on 11 April, she was again named the best puppy in the show.

At Crufts in 2016, over 22,000 dogs were entered. Burneze Geordie Girl won best of breed, then best of the Terrier Group and so qualified to be one of seven dogs competing for the title of Best in Show at Crufts. Judge Derek Smith gave his verdict and awarded the title to Burneze Geordie Girl, with a Whippet named as the reserve Best in Show.

The other five competitors were a German Spitz (Klein), a Pekingese, a Border Collie, a Bouvier des Flandres and a Gordon Setter. Burns said "I can’t believe it, it was amazing. She is a typical terrier, a bit of a tomboy, very independent and fun to be around."
