= COX4I1 =

Protein-coding gene in humans

Identifiers
- Aliases: COX4I1, COX4, COX4-1, COXIV, COX IV-1, COXIV-1, cytochrome c oxidase subunit 4I1, MC4DN16
- External IDs: OMIM: 123864; MGI: 88473; GeneCards: COX4I1

Gene location (Human)
Chr.	Chromosome 16 (human)
Band	16q24.1	Start	85,798,633 bp
Band	16q24.1	End	85,807,068 bp

Gene location (Mouse)
Chr.	Chromosome 8 (mouse)
Band	8 E1|8 69.99 cM	Start	121,394,961 bp
Band	8 E1|8 69.99 cM	End	121,400,946 bp
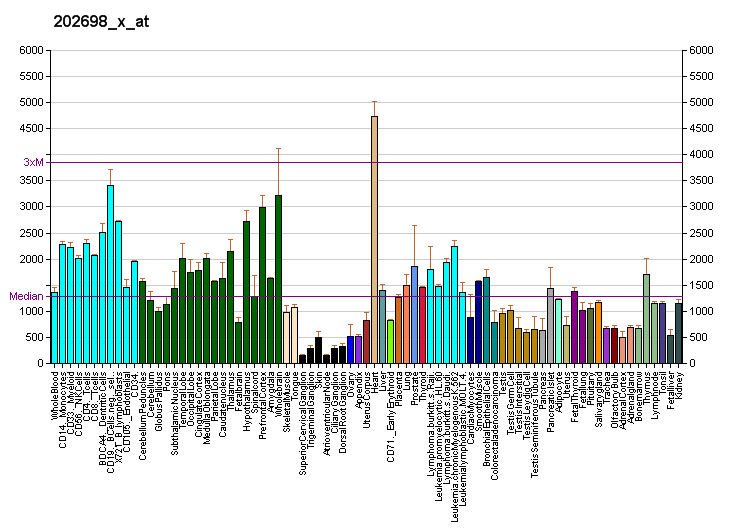
RNA expression pattern
Bgee	Human / Mouse (ortholog); Top expressed in: apex of heart; left ventricle; right auricle of heart; right ventricle; prefrontal cortex; myocardium of left ventricle; middle temporal gyrus; right frontal lobe; Brodmann area 9; Brodmann area 23 / Top expressed in: myocardium of ventricle; right ventricle; Epithelium of choroid plexus; soleus muscle; extraocular muscle; epithelium of stomach; brown adipose tissue; transitional epithelium of urinary bladder; thoracic diaphragm; nucleus accumbens; More reference expression data
BioGPS	More reference expression data
Gene ontology
Molecular function	protein binding; cytochrome-c oxidase activity
Cellular component	mitochondrial inner membrane; extracellular exosome; membrane; mitochondrion; nucleus; mitochondrial membranes; mitochondrial respiratory chain complex IV; integral component of membrane
Biological process	generation of precursor metabolites and energy; response to nutrient; proton transmembrane transport; mitochondrial electron transport, cytochrome c to oxygen; electron transport chain
Sources:Amigo / QuickGO
Orthologs
Databases	NCBI: entry; OMA: entry
Species	Human	Mouse
Entrez	1327	12857
Ensembl	ENSG00000131143	ENSMUSG00000031818
UniProt	P13073; Q86WV2	P19783
RefSeq (mRNA)	NM_001861; NM_001318786; NM_001318788; NM_001318794; NM_001318797 NM_001318802	NM_001293559; NM_009941
RefSeq (protein)	NP_001305715; NP_001305717; NP_001305723; NP_001305726; NP_001305731 NP_001852; NP_001305715.1	NP_001280488; NP_034071
Location (UCSC)	Chr 16: 85.8 – 85.81 Mb	Chr 8: 121.39 – 121.4 Mb
PubMed search
- Wikidata
View/Edit Human	View/Edit Mouse

Cytochrome c oxidase subunit 4 isoform 1, mitochondrial (COX4I1) is an enzyme that in humans is encoded by the COX4I1 gene. COX4I1 is a nuclear-encoded isoform of cytochrome c oxidase (COX) subunit 4. Cytochrome c oxidase (complex IV) is a multi-subunit enzyme complex that couples the transfer of electrons from cytochrome c to molecular oxygen and contributes to a proton electrochemical gradient across the inner mitochondrial membrane, acting as the terminal enzyme of the mitochondrial respiratory chain. Antibodies against COX4 can be used to identify the inner membrane of mitochondria in immunofluorescence studies. Mutations in COX4I1 have been associated with COX deficiency and Fanconi anemia.

== Structure ==
COX4I1 is located on the q arm of chromosome 16 in position 24.1 and has 6 exons. The COX4I1 gene produces a 9.3 kDa protein composed of 83 amino acids. COX4I1 is expressed ubiquitously. The protein encoded by COX4I1 belongs to the cytochrome c oxidase IV family. COX4I1 has a transit peptide domain and acetyl and phosphoprotein amino acid modifications. It is located at the 3' of the NOC4 (neighbor of COX4) gene in a head-to-head orientation and shares a promoter with it.

== Function ==
COX4I1 encodes a protein that is located in the inner mitochondrial membrane and is an isoform of the nuclear-encoded subunit IV of cytochrome c oxidase (complex IV), the terminal oxidase in mitochondrial electron transport. Complex IV is a multi-subunit enzyme complex that couples the transfer of electrons from cytochrome c to molecular oxygen and contributes to a proton electrochemical gradient across the inner mitochondrial membrane. The expression of COX4I1, along with COX4I2, may be regulated by oxygen levels, with reduced levels of oxygen leading to increased COX4I2 expression and COX4I1 degradation. This suggests a role for COX4I1 in the optimization of the electron transfer chain under different conditions.

== Clinical significance ==
Although relatively little is known about the function of COX4I1, mutations in this gene have been associated with mitochondrial complex IV diseases with severe phenotypes. Among these, COX deficiency and Fanconi anemia have been suspected and linked to mutations in the COX4I1 gene. Clinical features of pathogenic variants of COX4I1 can include short stature, poor weight gain, mild dysmorphic features, mental retardation, spastic paraplegia, severe epilepsy, a narrow and arched palate, malar hypoplasia, little subcutaneous fat, and arachnodactyly. The homozygous mutation K101N and a de novo 16q24.1 interstitial duplication have been found to cause defective COX4I1.

== Interactions ==
COX4I1 has 153 protein-protein interactions with 142 of them being co-complex interactions. COX4I1 has been found to interact with SDCBP, MT-CO1, IKBKE, TMBIM4, and MCL1.

LON, a mitochondrial protease, has also been suggested to regulate the COX4 subunit isoforms by degrading COX4I1 under hypoxic conditions.
