= Lymphoma in animals =

Type of cancer in animals

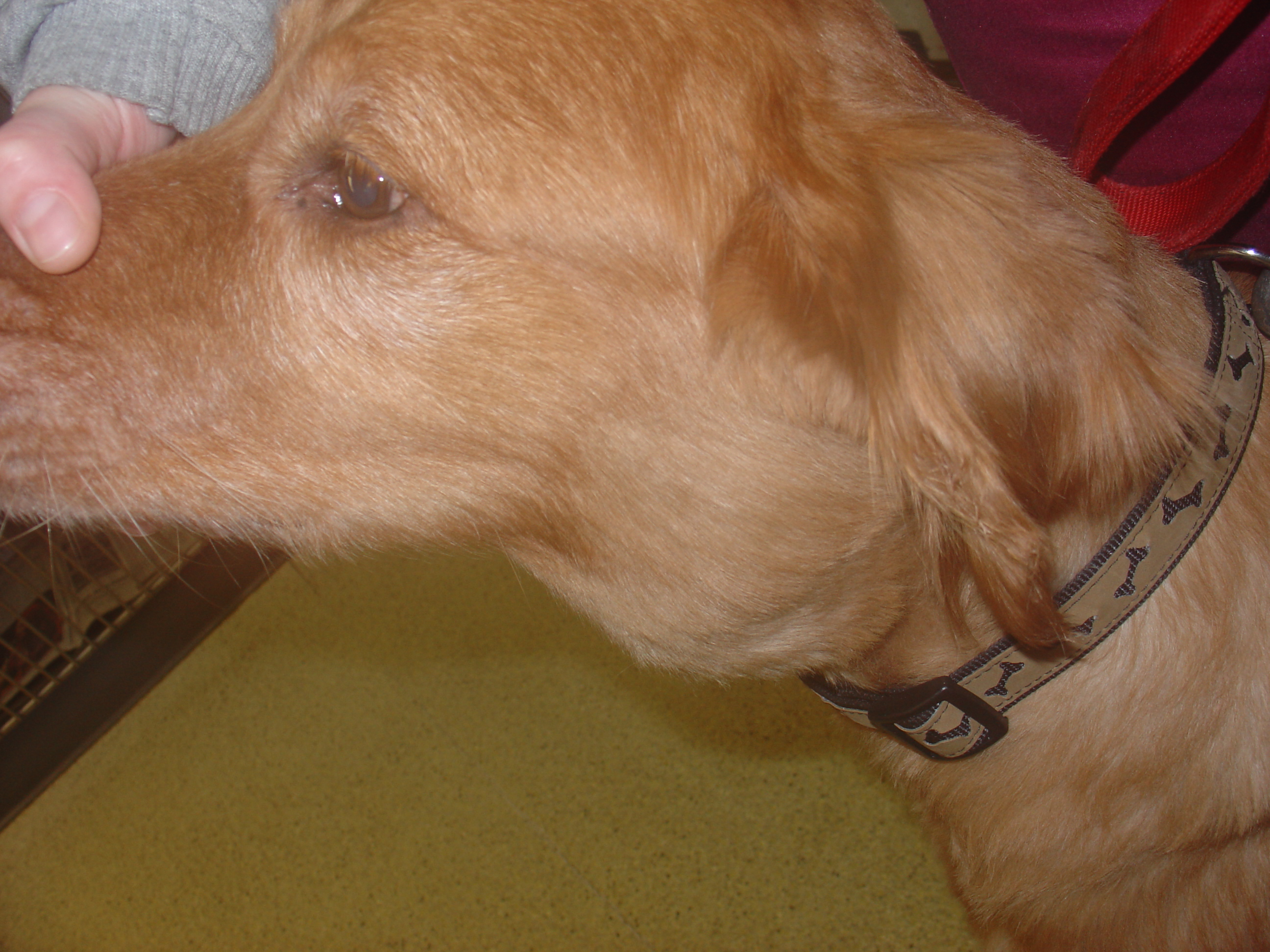
Lymphoma in a Golden Retriever

Lymphoma (lymphosarcoma) in animals is a type of cancer defined by a proliferation of malignant lymphocytes within solid organs such as the lymph nodes, bone marrow, liver and spleen. The disease also may occur in the eye, skin, and gastrointestinal tract.

== Lymphoma in dogs ==
Lymphoma is one of the most common malignant tumors to occur in dogs: it is the most common hematopoietic (blood-cell) cancer in the species, with a reported incidence approaching 0.1% of susceptible dogs. The cause is genetic, but there are also suspected environmental factors involved, including in one study an increased risk with the use of the herbicide 2,4-D. This risk was not confirmed in another study.

Breeds that are commonly affected include Boxer, Scottish Terrier, Basset Hound, Airedale Terrier, Chow Chow, German Shepherd, Poodle, St. Bernard, Bulldog, Beagle, Rottweiler and Golden Retriever. The Golden Retriever is especially susceptible to developing lymphoma, with a lifetime risk of 1:8.

=== Classification ===
The cancer is classified into low and high grade types. Classification is also based on location. The four location types are multicentric, mediastinal, gastrointestinal, and extranodal (involving the kidney, central nervous system, skin, heart, or eye). Multicentric lymphoma, the most common type (by greater than 80 percent), is found in the lymph nodes, with or without involvement in the liver, spleen, or bone marrow. Mediastinal lymphoma occurs in the lymph nodes in the thorax and possibly the thymus. Gastrointestinal lymphoma occurs as either a solitary tumor or diffuse invasion of the stomach or intestines, with or without involvement in the surrounding lymph nodes, liver or spleen. Classification is further based on involvement of B-lymphocytes or T-lymphocytes. Approximately 70 percent are B-cell lymphoma. Cutaneous lymphoma can be classified as epitheliotropic (closely conforming to the epidermis) or non-epitheliotropic. The epitheliotropic form is typically of T-cell origin and is also called mycosis fungoides. The non-epitheliotropic form is typically of B-cell origin.

=== Signs and symptoms ===
General signs and symptoms include depression, fever, weight loss, loss of appetite, loss of hair or fur and vomiting. Lymphoma is the most common cancerous cause of hypercalcemia (high blood calcium levels) in dogs. It can lead to the above signs and symptoms plus increased water drinking, increased urination, and cardiac arrhythmias. Hypercalcemia in these cases is caused by secretion of parathyroid hormone-related protein.

Multicentric lymphoma presents as painless enlargement of the peripheral lymph nodes. This is seen in areas such as under the jaw, the armpits, the groin, and behind the knees. Enlargement of the liver and spleen causes the abdomen to distend. Mediastinal lymphoma can cause fluid to collect around the lungs, leading to coughing and difficulty breathing. Hypercalcemia is most commonly associated with this type.

Gastrointestinal lymphoma causes vomiting, diarrhea, and melena (digested blood in the stool). Low serum albumin levels and hypercalcemia can also occur.

Lymphoma of the skin is an uncommon occurrence. The epitheliotropic form typically appears as itchy inflammation of the skin progressing to nodules and plaques. The non-epitheliotropic form can have a wide variety of appearances, from a single lump to large areas of bruised, ulcerated, hairless skin. The epitheliotropic form must be differentiated from similar appearing conditions such as pemphigus vulgaris, bullous pemphigoid, mycosis fungoides, and lupus erythematosus.

Signs for lymphoma in other sites depend on the location. Central nervous system involvement can cause seizures or paralysis. Eye involvement, seen in 20 to 25 percent of cases, can lead to glaucoma, uveitis, bleeding within the eye, retinal detachment, and blindness. Lymphoma in the bone marrow causes anemia, low platelet count, and low white blood cell count.

=== Diagnosis ===
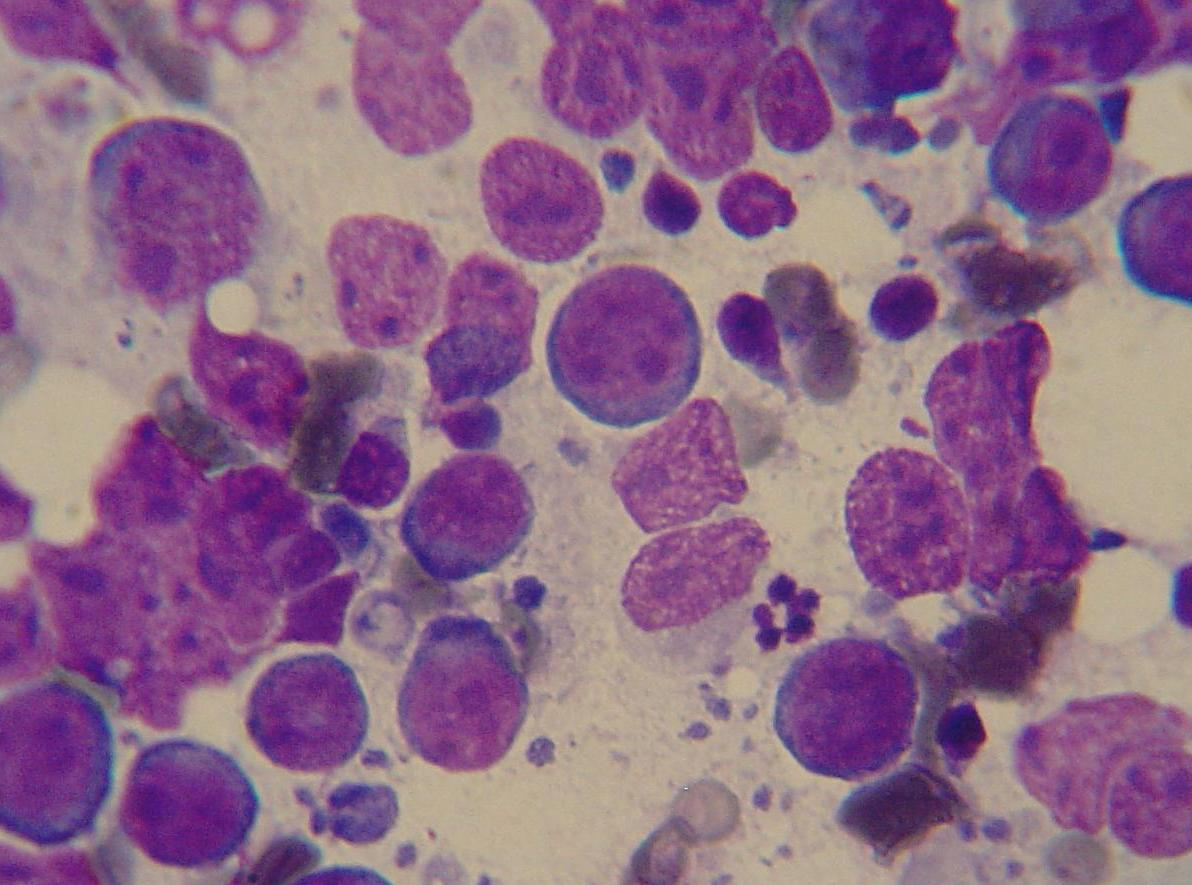
Cytology of lymphoma in a dog

Biopsy of affected lymph nodes or organs confirms the diagnosis, although a needle aspiration of an affected lymph node can increase suspicion of the disease. X-rays, ultrasound and bone marrow biopsy reveal other locations of the cancer. There are now a range of blood tests that can be utilised to aid in the diagnosis of lymphoma. Flow cytometry detects antibodies linked to tumour cell surface antigens in fluid samples or cell suspensions. Polymerase chain reaction (PCR) for antigen receptor rearrangements (PARR) identifies circulating tumour cells based on unique genetic sequences. The canine Lymphoma Blood Test (cLBT) measures multiple circulating biomarkers and utilises a complex algorithm to diagnose lymphoma. This test utilises the acute phase proteins (C-Reactive Protein and Haptoglobin). In combination with basic clinical symptoms, it gives in differential diagnosis the sensitivity 83.5% and specificity 77%. The TK canine cancer panel is an indicator of general neoplastic disease. The stage of the disease is important to treatment and prognosis. Certain blood tests have also been shown to be prognostic.

The stage of the disease is important to treatment and prognosis.

- Stage I – only one lymph node or lymphoid tissue in one organ involved.
- Stage II – lymph nodes in only one area of the body involved.
- Stage III – generalized lymph node involvement.
- Stage IV – any of the above with liver or spleen involvement.
- Stage V – any of the above with blood or bone marrow involvement.

Each stage is divided into either substage a, those without systemic symptoms; or substage b, those with systemic symptoms such as fever, loss of appetite, weight loss, and fatigue.

=== Treatment ===
Due to the high risk of recurrence and ensuing problems, close monitoring of dogs undergoing chemotherapy is important. The same is true for dogs that have entered remission and ceased treatment. Monitoring for disease and remission/recurrence is usually performed by palpation of peripheral lymph nodes. This procedure detects gross changes in peripheral lymph nodes. Some of the blood tests used in diagnosing lymphoma also offer greater objectivity and provide an earlier warning of an animal coming out of remission.

Complete cure is rare with lymphoma and treatment tends to be palliative, but long remission times are possible with chemotherapy. With effective protocols, average first remission times are 6 to 8 months. Second remissions are shorter and harder to accomplish. Average survival is 9 to 12 months. The most common treatment is a combination of cyclophosphamide, vincristine, prednisone, L-asparaginase, and doxorubicin. Other chemotherapy drugs such as chlorambucil, lomustine (CCNU), cytosine arabinoside, and mitoxantrone are sometimes used in the treatment of lymphoma by themselves or in substitution for other drugs. In most cases, appropriate treatment protocols cause few side effects, but white blood cell counts must be monitored.

Allogeneic and autologous stem cell transplantations (as is commonly done in humans) have recently been shown to be a possible treatment option for dogs. Most of the basic research on transplantation biology was generated in dogs. Current cure rates using stem cell therapy in dogs approximates that achieved in humans, 40-50%.

When cost is a factor, prednisone used alone can improve the symptoms dramatically, but it does not significantly affect the survival rate. The average survival times of dogs treated with prednisone and untreated dogs are both one to two months. Using prednisone alone can cause the cancer to become resistant to other chemotherapy agents, so it should only be used if more aggressive treatment is not an option.

Isotretinoin can be used to treat cutaneous lymphoma.

=== Prognosis ===
Untreated dogs have an average survival time of 60 days. Lymphoma with a histologic high grade generally respond better to treatment but have shorter survival times than dogs with low grade lymphoma. Dogs with B-lymphocyte tumors have a longer survival time than T-lymphocyte tumors. Mediastinal lymphoma has a poorer prognosis than other types, especially those with hypercalcemia. Clinical stage and substage have some prognostic value, with poorer prognosis associated with Stage V disease, and with substage b (clinical illness at time of presentation).

=== Notable patients ===
- Tucker Budzyn, social media influencer

== Lymphoma in cats ==
Lymphoma is the most common malignancy diagnosed in cats. Lymphoma in young cats occurs most frequently following infection with feline leukemia virus (FeLV) or to a lesser degree feline immunodeficiency virus (FIV). These cats tend to have involvement of lymph nodes, spine, or mediastinum. Cats with FeLV are 62 times more likely to develop lymphoma, and cats with both FeLV and FIV are 77 times more likely. Younger cats tend to have T-cell lymphoma and older cats tend to have B-cell lymphoma. Older cats tend to have gastrointestinal lymphoma without FeLV infection, although tests more sensitive to low level FeLV infections and replication-defective FeLV have found that many of these cats have been previously exposed. The same forms of lymphoma that are found in dogs also occur in cats, but gastrointestinal is the most common type. Lymphoma of the kidney is the most common kidney tumor in cats, and lymphoma is also the most common heart tumor.

=== Classification ===
Gastrointestinal lymphoma is classified into low grade, intermediate grade, and high grade. Low grade types include lymphocytic and small cell lymphoma. High grade types include lymphoblastic, immunoblastic, and large cell lymphoma. Low grade lymphoma is only found in the small intestine, while high grade can commonly be found in the stomach. The feline hepatic lymphoma is still poorly characterized, and it may be confused with lymphocytic portal hepatitis.

=== Symptoms ===
Cats that develop lymphoma are much more likely to develop more severe symptoms than dogs. Whereas dogs often appear healthy initially except for swollen lymph nodes, cats will often be physically ill. The symptoms correspond closely to the location of the lymphoma. The most common sites for alimentary (gastrointestinal) lymphoma are, in decreasing frequency, the small intestine, the stomach, the junction of the ileum, cecum, and colon. Cats with the alimentary form of lymphoma often present with weight loss, rough hair coat, loss of appetite, vomiting and diarrhea, although vomiting and diarrhea are commonly absent as symptoms. The tumor can also cause life-threatening blockage of the intestine. Cats with the mediastinal form often have respiratory distress and fluid in the thoracic cavity. If lymphoma develops in the kidney, the cat may have increased water consumption and increased urination. Lymphoma of the kidney presents as bilateral kidney enlargement and failure. If the lymphoma is located in the nose, the cat may have discharge from the nose and facial swelling. Lymphoma of the heart causes congestive heart failure, pericardial effusion, and cardiac arrhythmias. Ocular lymphoma in cats often presents as anterior uveitis (inflammation of the inside of the eye). Cats who are also infected with FeLV often present with pale mucous membranes due to anemia. Anemia is a common problem in all cats with lymphoma, but hypercalcemia is rare.

Diagnosis is similar to dogs, except cats should be tested for FeLV and FIV. It is important to differentiate the alimentary form of lymphoma from inflammatory bowel disease because the signs are so similar in cats. A biopsy is necessary to do this. One approach to differentiate inflammatory bowel disease is to test the infiltrating lymphocytes for their monoclonal origin in lymphomas.

=== Treatment and prognosis ===
Chemotherapy is the mainstay of treatment for lymphoma in cats. Most of the drugs used in dogs are used in cats, but the most common protocol uses cyclophosphamide, vincristine, and prednisolone. Gastrointestinal lymphoma has also commonly been treated with a combination of prednisolone and high dose pulse chlorambucil with success. The white blood cell count must be monitored. Remission and survival times are comparable to dogs. Lower stage lymphoma has a better prognosis. Multicentric lymphoma has a better response to treatment than the gastrointestinal form, but infection with FeLV worsens the prognosis.

About 75% of cats treated with chemotherapy for lymphoma go into remission. Unfortunately, after an initial remission, most cats experience a relapse, after which they have a median survival of 6 months. However, about one-third of cats treated with chemotherapy will survive more than 2 years after diagnosis; a small number of these cats may be cured of their disease. Untreated, most cats with lymphoma die within 4–6 weeks. Most cats tolerate their chemotherapy well, and fewer than 5% have severe side effects. Cats do not lose their fur from chemotherapy, though loss of whiskers is possible. Other side effects include low white blood cell count, vomiting, loss of appetite, diarrhea, or fatigue. These can typically be controlled well, and most cats have a good quality of life during treatment. If a cat relapses after attaining remission, the cat can be treated with different chemotherapy drugs to try for a second remission. The chances of a second remission are much lower than the chances of obtaining a first, and the second remission is often shorter than the first.

== Lymphoma in ferrets ==
Lymphoma is common in ferrets and is the most common cancer in young ferrets. There is some evidence that a retrovirus may play a role in the development of lymphoma like in cats. The most commonly affected tissues are the lymph nodes, spleen, liver, intestine, mediastinum, bone marrow, lung, and kidney.

In young ferrets, the disease progresses rapidly. The most common symptom is difficulty breathing caused by enlargement of the thymus. Other symptoms include loss of appetite, weight loss, weakness, depression, and coughing. It can also masquerade as a chronic disease such as an upper respiratory infection or gastrointestinal disease. In older ferrets, lymphoma is usually chronic and can exhibit no symptoms for years. Symptoms seen are the same as in young ferrets, plus splenomegaly, abdominal masses, and peripheral lymph node enlargement.

Diagnosis is through biopsy and X-rays. There may also be an increased lymphocyte count. Treatment includes surgery for solitary tumors, splenectomy (when the spleen is very large), and chemotherapy. The most common protocol uses prednisone, vincristine, and cyclophosphamide. Doxorubicin is used in some cases. Chemotherapy in relatively healthy ferrets is tolerated very well, but possible side effects include loss of appetite, depression, weakness, vomiting, and loss of whiskers. The white blood cell count must be monitored. Prednisone used alone can work very well for weeks to months, but it may cause resistance to other chemotherapy agents. Alternative treatments include vitamin C and Pau d'Arco (a bark extract).

The prognosis for lymphoma in ferrets depends on their health and the location of the cancer. Lymphoma in the mediastinum, spleen, skin, and peripheral lymph nodes has the best prognosis, while lymphoma in the intestine, liver, abdominal lymph nodes, and bone marrow has the worst.

== See also ==
- Lymphadenopathy
