= Scottish Terrier =

Black terrier dog breed from Scotland

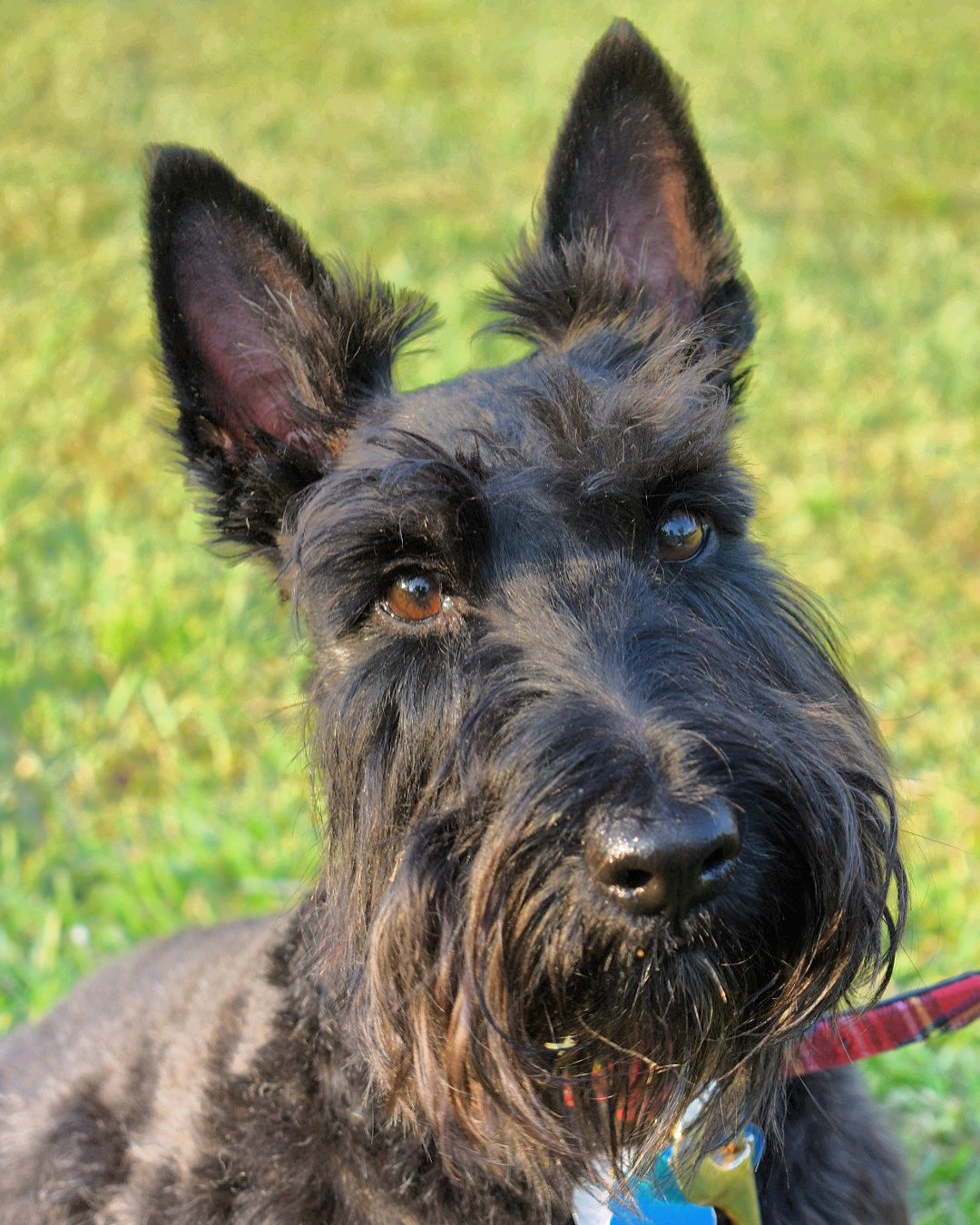
- 1.5-year-old black Scottish Terrier
- Common nicknames: Scottie, Aberdeenie
- Origin: Scotland
Traits
Height	Males	25 cm (9.8 in)
	Females	25 cm (9.8 in)
Weight	Males	8.5–10 kg (19–22 lb)
	Females	8–9.5 kg (18–21 lb)
- Coat: double (hard wiry & soft undercoat)
- Colour: Black, Brindle, Wheaten
Kennel club standards
- The Kennel Club: standard
- Fédération Cynologique Internationale: standard

The Scottish Terrier (Scottish Gaelic: Abhag Albannach; also known as the Aberdeen Terrier), popularly called the Scottie, is a breed of dog. Initially one of the highland breeds of terrier that were grouped under the name of Skye Terrier, it is one of five breeds of terrier that originated in Scotland, the other four being the modern Skye, Cairn, Dandie Dinmont, and West Highland White terriers. They are an independent and rugged breed with a wiry outer coat and a soft dense undercoat. The first Earl of Dumbarton nicknamed the breed "the diehard". According to legend, the Earl of Dumbarton gave this nickname because of the Scottish Terriers' bravery, and Scotties were also the inspiration for the name of his regiment, The Royal Scots, Dumbarton's Diehard. Scottish Terriers were originally bred to hunt vermin on farms.

They are a small breed of terrier with a distinctive shape and have had many roles in popular culture. They have been owned by a variety of celebrities, including the 32nd president of the United States, Franklin D. Roosevelt, whose Scottie Fala is included with FDR in a statue in Washington, D.C., as well as by the 43rd president, George W. Bush. They are also well known for being a playing piece in the board game Monopoly. Described as territorial, feisty dogs, they can make a good watchdog and tend to be very loyal to their family. Healthwise, Scottish Terriers can be more prone to bleeding disorders, joint disorders, autoimmune diseases, allergies, and cancer than some other breeds of dog, and there is a condition named after the breed called Scotty cramp. They are also one of the more successful dog breeds at the Westminster Kennel Club Dog Show with a best in show in 2010.

== History ==
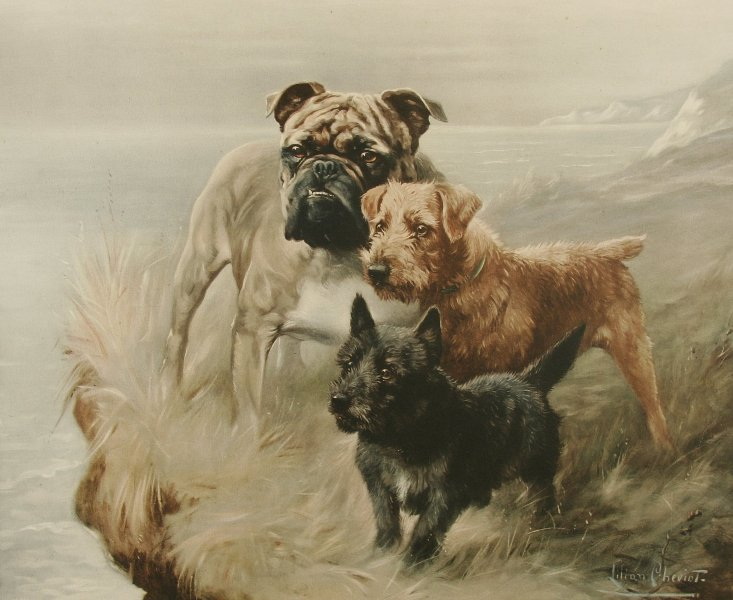
Come Over Here! (1915) by Lilian Cheviot, showing the approximate differences in sizes between the Scottish Terrier, the Welsh Terrier and the Bulldog.

Initial grouping of several of the highland terriers (including the Scottie) under the generic name Skye Terriers caused some confusion in the breed's lineage. There is disagreement over whether the Skye Terriers mentioned in early 16th century records actually descended from forerunners of the Scottie or vice versa. It is certain, however, that Scotties and West Highland White Terriers are closely related—both their forefathers originated from the Blackmount region of Perthshire and the Moor of Rannoch. Scotties were originally bred to hunt and kill vermin on farms and to hunt badgers and foxes in the Highlands of Scotland.

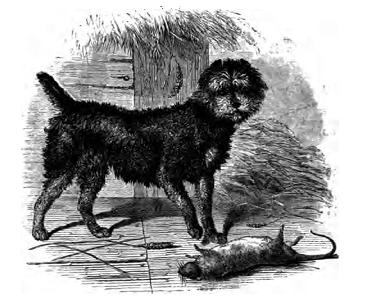
A Scotch Terrier, published in 1859

The actual origin of a breed as old as the Scottish Terrier is obscure and undocumented. The first written records about a dog of similar description to the Scottish Terrier dates from 1436, when Don Leslie described them in his book The History of Scotland 1436–1561. Two hundred years later, Sir Joshua Reynolds painted a portrait of a young girl caressing a dog similar in appearance to the modern-day Scottie. King James VI of Scotland was an important historical figure featuring in the Scottish Terrier's history. In the 17th century, when King James VI became James I of England, he sent six terriers—thought to be forerunners of the Scottish terrier—to a French monarch as a gift. His love and adoration for the breed increased their popularity throughout the world.

Many dog writers after the early 19th century seem to agree that there were two varieties of terrier existing in Britain at the time—a rough-haired so-called Scotch Terrier and a smooth-haired English Terrier. Thomas Brown, in his Biological Sketches and Authentic Anecdotes of Dogs (1829), states that "the Scotch Terrier is certainly the purest in point of breed and the (smooth) English seems to have been produced by a cross from him". Brown went on to describe the Scotch Terrier as "low in stature, with a strong muscular body, short stout legs, a head large in proportion to the body" and was "generally of a sandy colour or black" with a "long, matted and hard" coat. Although the Scotch Terrier described here is more generic than specific to a breed, it asserts the existence of a small, hard, rough-coated terrier developed for hunting small game in the Scottish Highlands in the early 19th century; a description that shares characteristics with what was once known as the Aberdeen Terrier and is today known as the Scottish Terrier. In addition, the paintings of Sir Edwin Landseer and an 1835 lithograph entitled "Scottish Terriers at Work on a Cairn in the West Highlands" both depict Scottie type terriers very similar to those described in the first Scottish Terrier Standard.

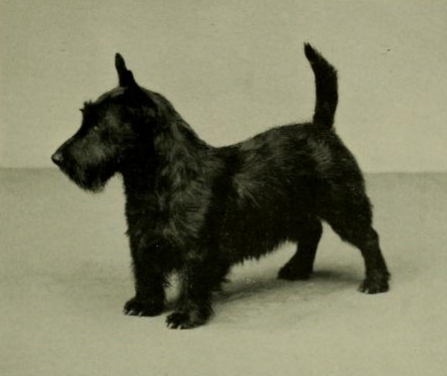
Ch. Bapton Norman, a popular sire from 1914.

In the 19th century, the Highlands of Scotland, including the Isle of Skye, were abundant with terriers originally known by the generic term "short-haired terriers" or "little Skye Terriers". Towards the end of the 19th century, it was decided to separate these Scottish terriers and develop pure bloodlines and specific breeds. Originally, the breeds were separated into two categories: Dandie Dinmont Terriers and Skye Terriers (not the Skye Terrier known today, but a generic name for a large group of terriers with differing traits all said to originate from the Isle of Skye). The Birmingham England dog show of 1860 was the first to offer classes for these groups of terriers. They continued to be exhibited in generic groups for several years and these groups included the ancestors of today's Scottish Terrier. Recorded history and the initial development of the breed started in the late 1870s with the development of dog shows. The exhibition and judging of dogs required comparison to a breed standard and thus the appearance and temperament of the Scottie was written down for the first time. Eventually, the Skye Terriers were further divided into what are known today as the Scottish Terrier, Skye Terrier, West Highland White Terrier and Cairn Terrier.

While fanciers sought to identify and standardize the breed and its description through the late 19th century, the Scottish Terrier was known by many different names: the Highland, the Cairn, Diehard, and most often, the Aberdeen Terrier—named because of the abundant number of the dogs in the area and because a J. A. Adamson of Aberdeen successfully exhibited his dogs during the 1870s. Roger Rough, a dog owned by Adamson, Tartan, a dog owned by Mr Paynton Piggott, Bon Accord, owned by Messrs Ludlow and Bromfield, and Splinter II owned by Mr Ludlow, were early winners of dog exhibitions and are the four dogs from which all Scottish Terrier pedigrees ultimately began. It is often said that all present day Scotties stem from a single bitch, Splinter II, and two sires. In her book, The New Scottish Terrier, Cindy Cooke refers to Splinter II as the "foundation matron of the modern Scottish Terrier." Cooke goes on to say "For whatever reason, early breeders line bred on this bitch to the virtual exclusion of all others. Mated to Tartan, she produced Worry, the dam of four champions. Rambler, her son by Bonaccord, sired the two founding sires of the breed, Ch. Dundee (out of Worry) and Ch. Alistair (out of a Dundee daughter)" Show champions on both sides of the Atlantic descend from Splinter and her sires.

Captain Gordon Murray and S.E. Shirley were responsible for setting the type in 1879. Shortly afterwards, in 1879, Scotties were for the first time exhibited at Alexandra Palace in England, while the following year they began to be classified in much the same way as is done today. The first written standard of the breed was drafted by J.B. Morrison and D.J. Thomson Gray and appeared in Vero Shaw's Illustrated Book of The Dog, published in 1880; it was extremely influential in setting both breed type and name. The standard described the breed's colouring as "Grey, Grizzle or Brindle", as the typically Black colouring of Scotties did not become fashionable or favoured until the 20th century.

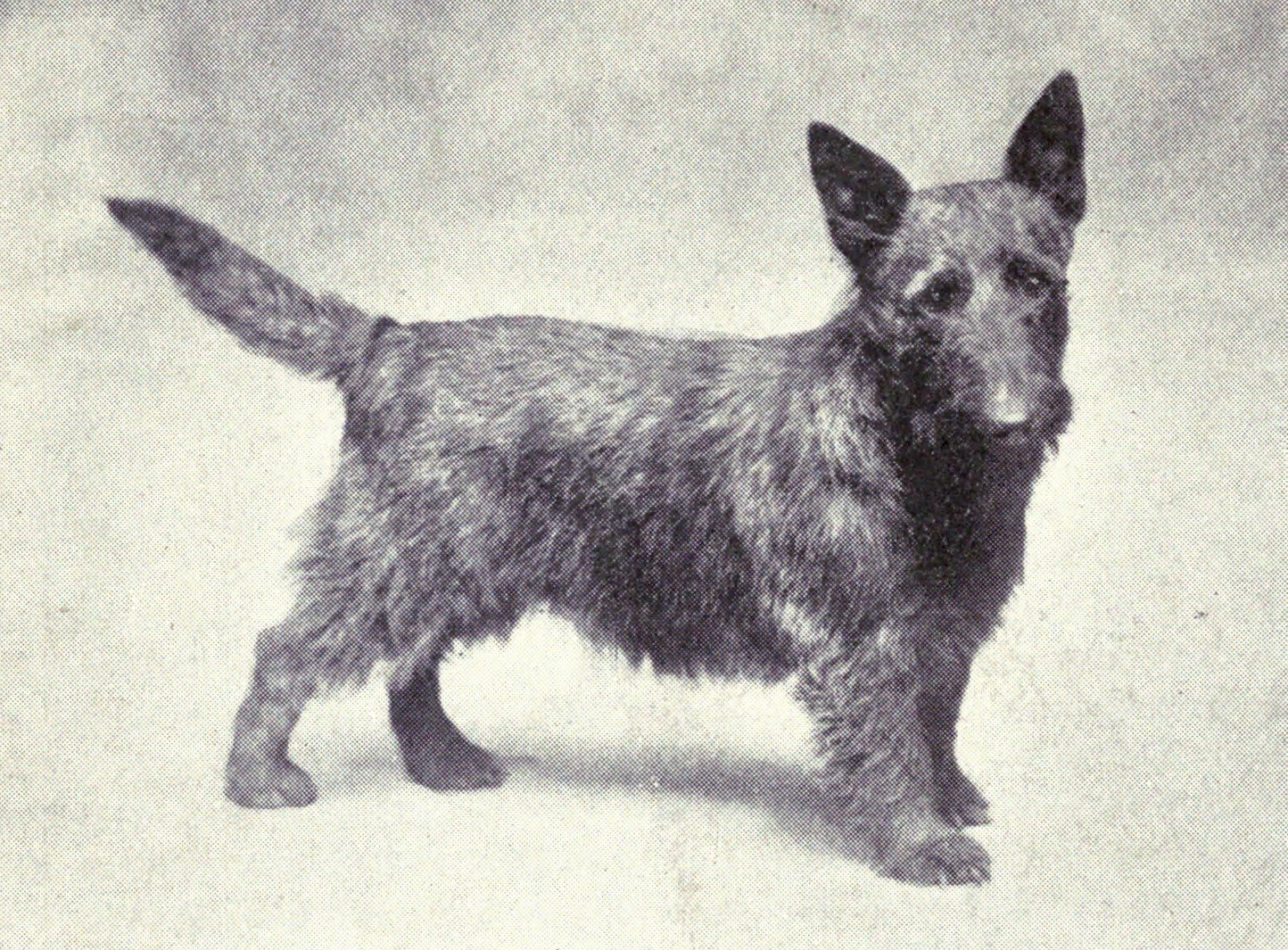
Scottish Terrier circa 1915

In 1881 the "Scottish Terrier Club of England" was founded, being the first club dedicated to the breed. The club secretary, H.J. Ludlow, is responsible for greatly popularising the breed in the southern parts of Great Britain. The "Scottish Terrier Club of Scotland" was not founded until 1888, seven years after the English club. Following the formation of the English and Scottish clubs there followed several years of disagreement regarding the breed's official standard. The issue was finally settled by a revised standard in 1930, which was based on four prepotent dogs. The dogs were Robert and James Chapman's Heather Necessity, Albourne Barty, bred by AG Cowley, Albourne Annie Laurie, bred by Miss Wijk and Miss Wijk's Marksman of Docken (the litter brother of Annie Laurie). These four dogs and their offspring modified the look of the Scottie, particularly the length of the head, closeness to the ground and the squareness of body. Their subsequent success in the show ring led to them becoming highly sought after by the British public and breeders. As such, the modified standard completely revolutionized the breed. This new standard was subsequently recognised by the Kennel Club UK circa 1930.

Scotties were introduced to America in the early 1890s, but it was not until the years between World War I and World War II that the breed became popular. The Scottish Terrier Club of America (STCA) was formed in 1900 and a standard written in 1925. The Scottish Terrier was recognized by the United Kennel Club in 1934. By 1936, Scotties were the third most popular breed in the United States. Although they did not permanently stay in fashion, they continue to enjoy a steady popularity with a large segment of the dog-owning public across the world. The STCA founded its Health Trust Fund (HTF) in 1995 which supports research on health issues in the breed.

Scottish Terriers have won best in show at the Westminster Kennel Club Dog Show more than any other breed except for the Wire Fox Terrier, a total of nine times. These victories began in 1911 with a win by Ch. Tickle Em Jock and include recent victories such as in 1995 when Ch. Gaelforce Post Script (Peggy Sue) won, and in 2010 with a victory by Ch. Roundtown Mercedes Of Maryscot.

== Description ==
=== Appearance ===
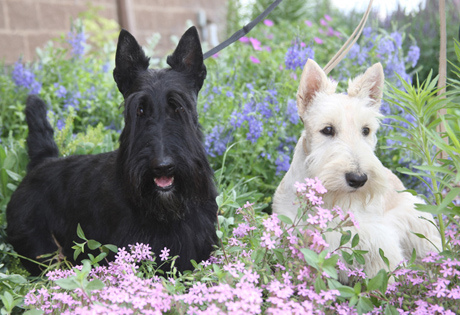
A black and a wheaten Scottish Terrier

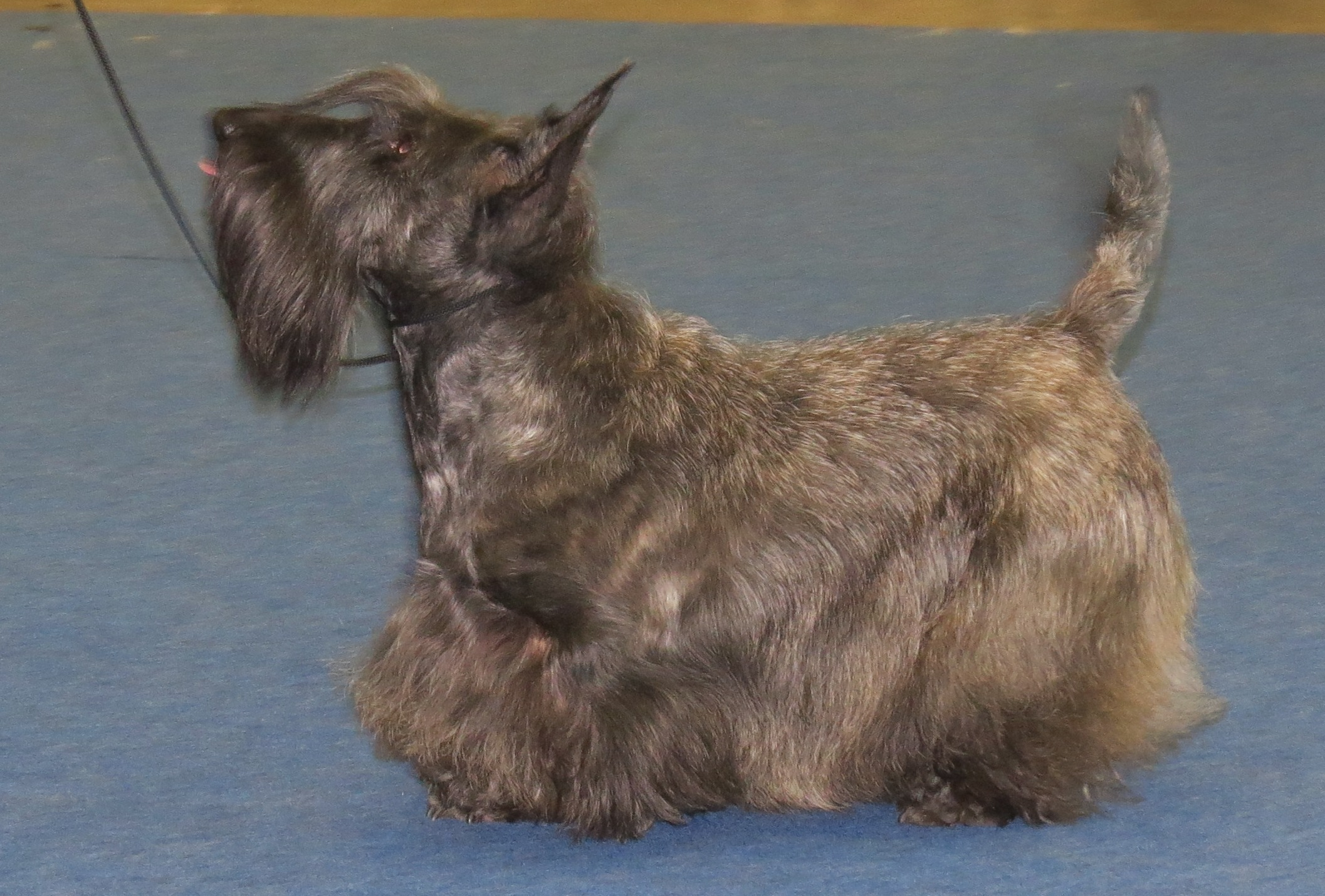
A brindle Scottish Terrier

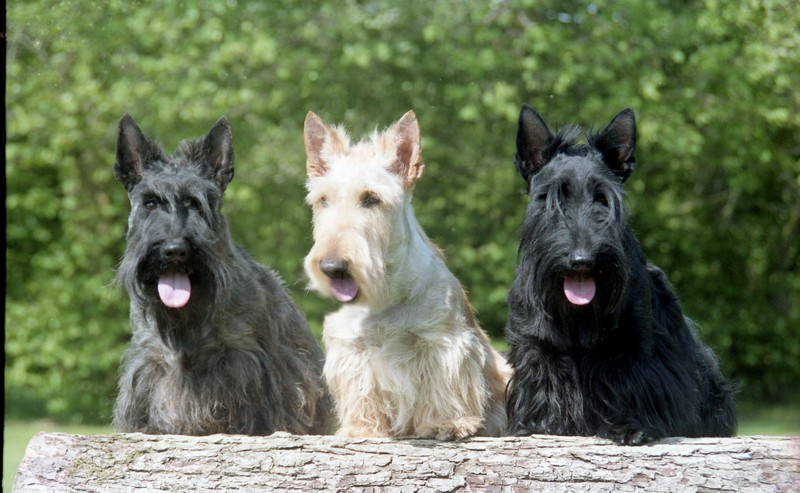
Scottish Terriers in three colours

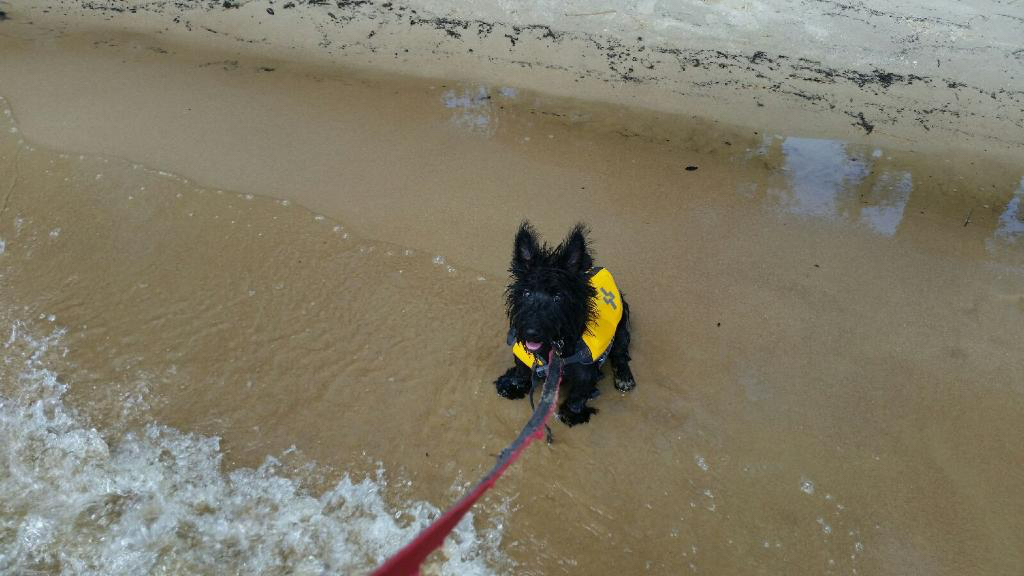
Scottish Terrier with life jacket.

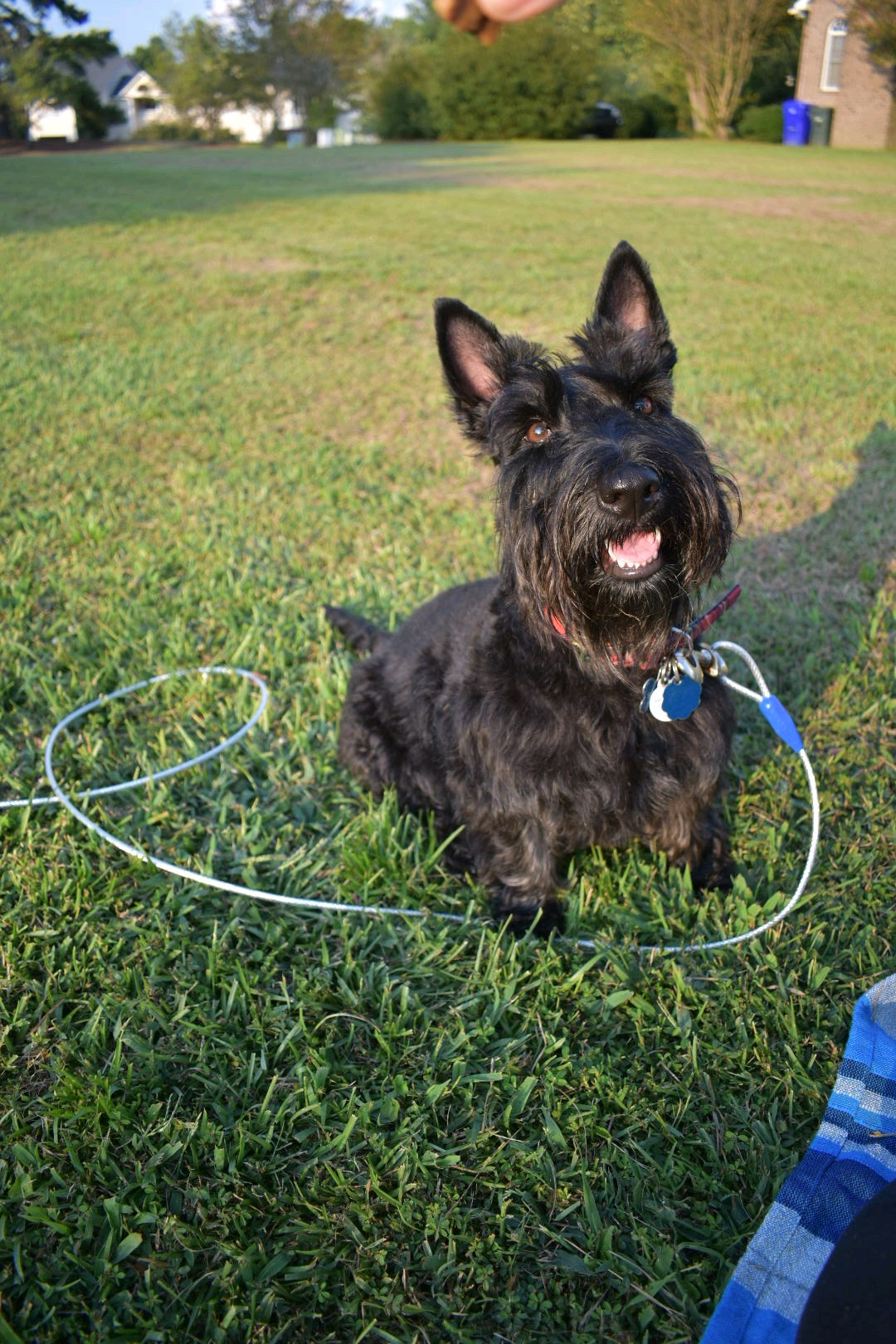
Scottish Terrier

The Scottish Terrier is a small, compact, short-legged, sturdily-built terrier of good bone and substance. They have a hard, wiry, weather-resistant coat and a thick-set, cobby body which is hung between short, heavy legs. These characteristics, joined with their very special keen, piercing, "varminty" expression, and their erect ears and tail are salient features of the breed. According to The Scottish Terrier Club of America's Breed Standard, the eyes should be small, bright and piercing, and almond-shaped not round. Their color can range from black, greyish-black, and even white. The ears should be small, prick, set well up on the skull and pointed, but never cut. They should be covered with short velvety hair.

According to the STCA Breed Standard, height at withers for both genders should be roughly 25 cm (9.8 in), and the length of back from withers to tail is roughly 28 cm (11 in). Generally a well-balanced Scottie dog should weigh from 8.5 to 10 kg (19 to 22 lb) and a female from 8 to 9.5 kg (18 to 21 lb). It is about 10 to 11 inches (25 to 28 cm) in height.

=== Coat ===
The Scottish Terrier typically has a hard, wiry outer coat with a soft, dense undercoat. According to the STCA Breed Standard, the coat should be trimmed and blended into the furnishings to give a distinct Scottish Terrier outline. The longer coat on the beard, legs and lower body may be slightly softer than the body coat but should not be or appear fluffy. This longer coat on the legs is often referred to as the skirt of the Scottie and should be brushed daily to avoid knotted or matted fur.

The coat colours range from dark gray to jet black and brindle, a mix of black and brown. Scotties with wheaten (straw to nearly white) coats sometimes occur, and are similar in appearance to the Soft-Coated Wheaten Terrier or West Highland White Terrier.

Many black and brindle Scottish Terrier coats can contain specks of silver and white all throughout or in small patch-like areas of the dog's fur.

== Temperament ==
Scotties are territorial, alert, quick moving and feisty, perhaps even more so than other terrier breeds. The breed is known to be independent and self-assured, playful, intelligent, and has been nicknamed the 'Diehard' because of its rugged nature and endless determination. The "Diehard" nickname was originally given to it in the 18th century by George, the first Earl of Dumbarton. The Earl had a famous pack of Scottish Terriers, so brave that they were named "Diehards". They were supposed to have inspired the name of his Regiment, The Royal Scots, "Dumbarton's Diehards".

Scotties, while being described as very loving, have also been described as stubborn. They are sometimes described as an aloof breed, although it has been noted that they tend to be very loyal to their family and are known to attach themselves to one or two people.

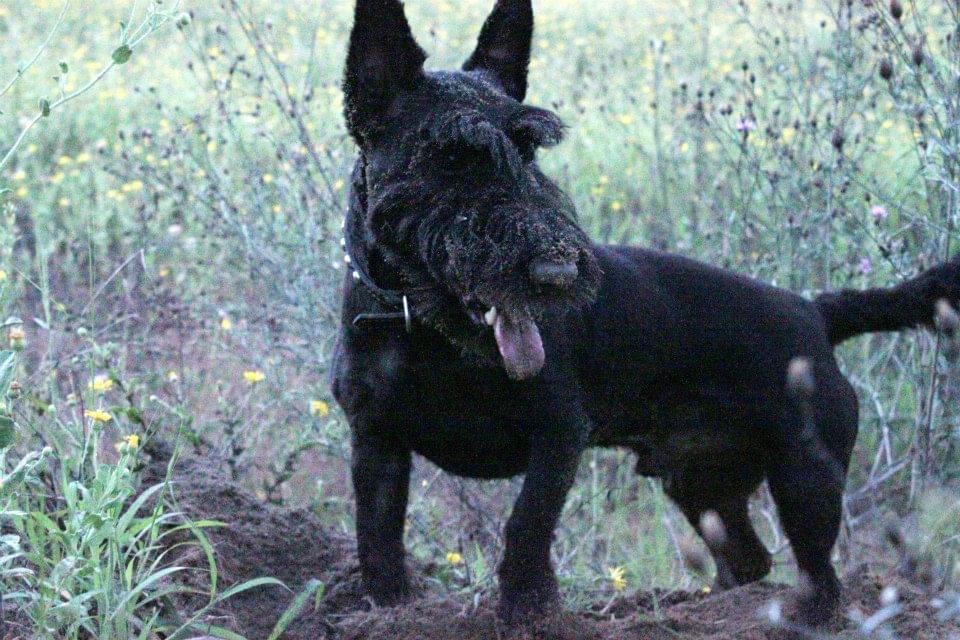
A Scottish Terrier can be groomed to trim off the breed-specific skirt.

It has been suggested that the Scottish Terrier can make a good watchdog due to its tendency to bark only when necessary and because it is typically reserved with strangers, although this is not always the case. They have been described as a fearless breed that may be aggressive around other dogs unless introduced at an early age. Scottish Terriers were originally bred to hunt and fight Eurasian badgers. Therefore, the Scottie is prone to dig as well as chase small mammals, such as squirrels, rats, and mice. Keeping cats, rabbits, ferrets, and other small Domesticated animals in the home with a Scottish terrier is not advisable due to the fact that this dog breed was specifically bred to hunt small mammals, as mentioned above. Properly socialized with children Scotties are suitable as a family pet and they will also happily act as a protector. Scottish Terriers are not recommended to cohabitate with small children or children who are inexperienced with dogs.

== Health ==
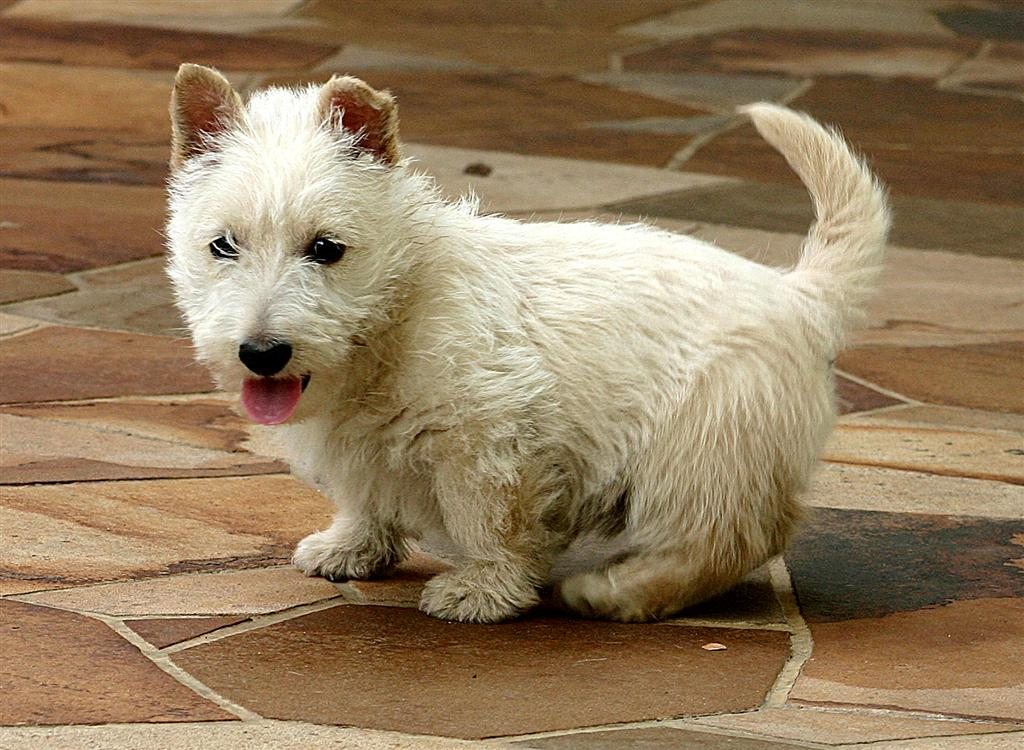
Although black is the most traditional colour for a Scottie, Wheaten Scotties can also be found, as shown in this picture of a Scottie puppy.

A 2024 UK study found a life expectancy of 12.7 years for the breed compared to an average of 12.7 for purebreeds and 12 for crossbreeds. Two genetic health concerns seen in the breed are von Willebrand disease (vWD) and craniomandibular osteopathy (CMO); Scottie cramp, patellar luxation and cerebellar abiotrophy are also sometimes seen in this breed. Common eye conditions seen in a variety of breeds such as cataracts and glaucoma can appear in Scotties as they age. There are no specific conditions relating the skin that affect the breed, but they can be affected by common dog related conditions such as parasites and mange.

=== Cancer in Scottish Terriers ===
Scottish Terriers have a greater chance of developing some cancers than other purebreds. According to research by the Veterinary Medical Data Program (1986), six cancers that Scotties appeared to be more at risk for (when compared to other breeds) are: (in descending order) bladder cancer and other transitional cell carcinomas of the lower urinary tract; melanoma; gastric carcinoma; squamous cell carcinoma of the skin; lymphosarcoma and nasal carcinoma. Other cancers that are known to commonly affect Scotties include mast cell sarcoma and hemangiosarcoma.

Research has suggested that Scottish Terriers are 20 times more likely to get bladder cancer than other breeds and the most common kind of bladder cancer is transitional cell carcinoma of the bladder (TCC). Dr. Deborah Knapp of Purdue University School of Veterinary Medicine has commented "TCC usually occurs in older dogs (average age 11 years) and is more common in females (2:1 ratio of females to males)." Symptoms of TCC are blood in the urine, straining to urinate, and frequent urination—although owners noticing any of these symptoms should also be aware that the same symptoms may also be indicative of a urinary tract infection.

The most common and effective form of treatment for TCC is Piroxicam, a non-steroidal anti-inflammatory drug that "allows the cancer cells to kill themselves."

=== Scottie cramp ===
Scottie cramp is an autosomal recessive hereditary disorder which inhibits the dog's ability to walk. It is caused by a defect in the pathways in the brain that control muscle contraction due to a low level of serotonin in the body. Typically symptoms only show when the particular dog is under some degree of stress. The front legs are pushed out to the side, the back arches and the rear legs overflex, causing the dog to fall should it be moving at speed. The condition is not seizure related, and the dog remains conscious throughout the event, with symptoms abating once the cause of the stress has been removed. Currently, there is no known genetic testing available for Scottie cramp. A diagnosis will come from a veterinarian once diagnostic tests have been conducted. Diagnostic tests for Scottie cramp, include a physical, complete blood count, a biochemistry profile, and a urinalysis. Although Scottie cramp is an inherited disease, it is a non-painful, non-life-threatening, episodic disorder. Affected dogs with Scotty cramp and their litter mates should not be bred, otherwise this disease can be passed to any future offspring they may have.

Vitamin E, Diazepam and Prozac have all been shown to be effective treatments should it be required. Scotty cramp is found in other breeds of terrier, including the Cesky Terrier. "Episodic Falling", a condition found in Cavalier King Charles Spaniels is considered to be similar to this disorder.

=== Craniomandibular osteopathy ===
Craniomandibular osteopathy, commonly known as "Lion Jaw", "Westie Jaw" or "Scottie Jaw", is caused by excessive bone growth in the mandible, usually occurring between three and six months of age. It is an autosomal recessive hereditary disorder, and can limit the ability of a dog to eat and drink. The Scottish Terrier is one of the more commonly affected breeds.

=== Von Willebrand's disease ===
Von Willebrand's disease is a hereditary bleeding disorder found in both dogs and humans. DNA testing used widespread by what are known as reputable breeders, has caused a huge decrease in affected dogs. Once the mutation is found in a dog, the dog should not be bred. This disease is caused by a lack of von Willebrand factor which plays a role in the clotting process of blood. This can cause abnormal platelet function and prolonged bleeding times. Affected dogs can be prone to nose bleeds, and increased bleeding following trauma or surgery. There are three types of this condition with Type I being the most common, while Type II and III being rarer, but more severe. Type I von Willebrand's disease is relatively common in the Scottish Terrier.

Type I is more widespread in Doberman Pinscher, but is as common in the Shetland Sheepdog as the Scottish Terrier. The condition appears in most breeds to some extent, but other breeds with an increased risk include the Golden Retriever, German Shepherd Dog, Basset Hound and Manchester Terrier.

== See also ==
- List of domesticated Scottish breeds
- Scotty dog sign (radiological term)
