= White dog shaker syndrome =

Disease in dogs

White dog shaker syndrome (also known as idiopathic steroid responsive shaker syndrome, shaker dog syndrome, "little white shakers" syndrome and idiopathic cerebellitis) causes full body tremors in small dog breeds. It is most common in West Highland White Terriers, Maltese, Bichons, Poodles, and other small dogs. There is a sudden onset of the disease at one to two years of age. It is more likely to occur, and the symptom is worse during times of stress. Nystagmus, difficulty walking, and seizures may occur in some dogs.

The cause is unknown, but it may be mediated by the immune system. One theory is that there is an autoimmune-induced generalized deficiency of neurotransmitters. Cerebrospinal fluid analysis may reveal an increased number of lymphocytes. Treatment with corticosteroids may put the dog into remission, or diazepam may control the symptoms. Typically the two drugs are used together. There is a good prognosis, and symptoms usually resolve with treatment within a week, although lifelong treatment may be necessary.
