= West Highland White Terrier =

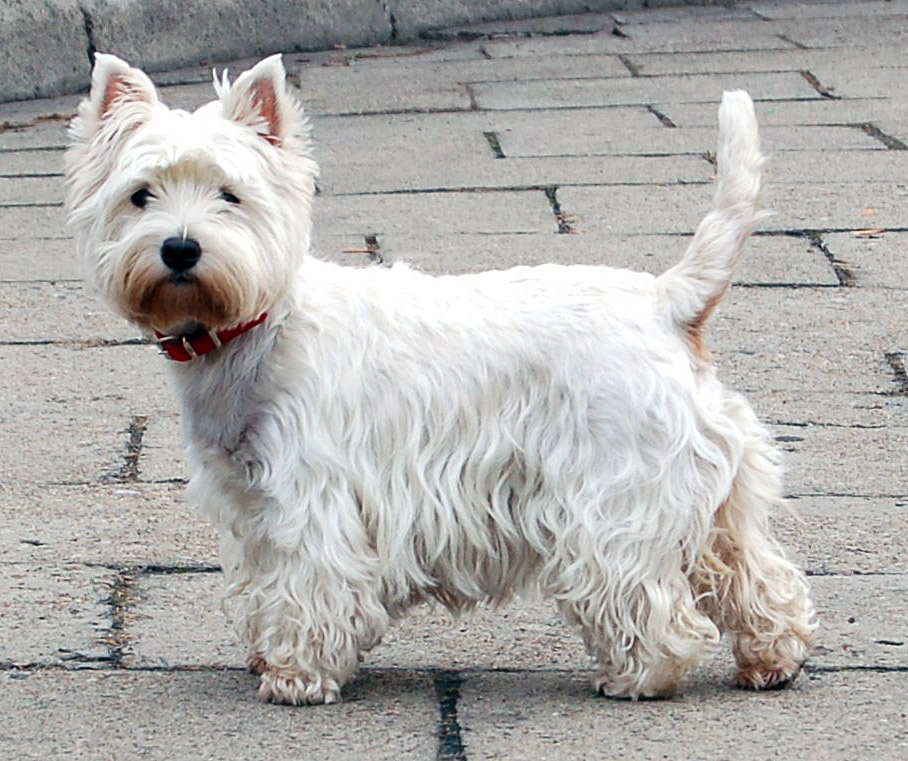
- Other names: Poltalloch Terrier; Roseneath Terrier; White Roseneath Terrier
- Common nicknames: Westie; Westy
- Origin: Scotland
Traits
- Height: 25–28 cm (9.8–11.0 in)
- Weight: 6.8–9.1 kg (15–20 lb)
- Coat: Double
- Colour: White
- Litter size: 3 to 5
Kennel club standards
- The Kennel Club: standard
- Fédération Cynologique Internationale: standard

The West Highland White Terrier (commonly shortened to Westie) is a Scottish dog breed with a distinctive white harsh coat and somewhat soft white undercoat. It is a medium-sized terrier but has longer legs than other Scottish terriers. It has a white double coat of fur which fills out its face, giving it a rounded appearance.

The Westie is intelligent and quick to learn. It is social and can be good with children, but rarely tolerates rough handling and sometimes prefers solitude. Having been bred to hunt small rodents on farms, it is an energetic and boisterous breed with a high prey drive and thus needs regular exercise of around one hour per day. The modern breed is descended from a number of pre-20th century breeding programmes of white terriers in Scotland. Edward Donald Malcolm, 16th Laird of Poltalloch, is credited with the creation of the modern breed from his Poltalloch Terrier, but did not want to be known as such.

The Westie is a cousin of the Cairn Terrier and is related to other breeds such as the Roseneath Terrier (bred by George Campbell, 8th Duke of Argyll) and Pittenweem Terrier (bred by Americ Edwin Flaxman). The Westie was given its modern name for the first time in 1908, with recognition by major kennel clubs occurring around the same time. The breed remains very popular in the United Kingdom, with multiple wins at Crufts, and has been in the top third of all breeds in the United States since the 1960s. Several breed-specific and non-specific health problems appear in Westies, including craniomandibular osteopathy, which is also called "Westie jaw" and is a condition in young dogs which causes an overgrowth of the bone in the jaw. The breed can also be prone to skin disorders such as the breed-specific condition hyperplastic dermatosis.

== Appearance ==
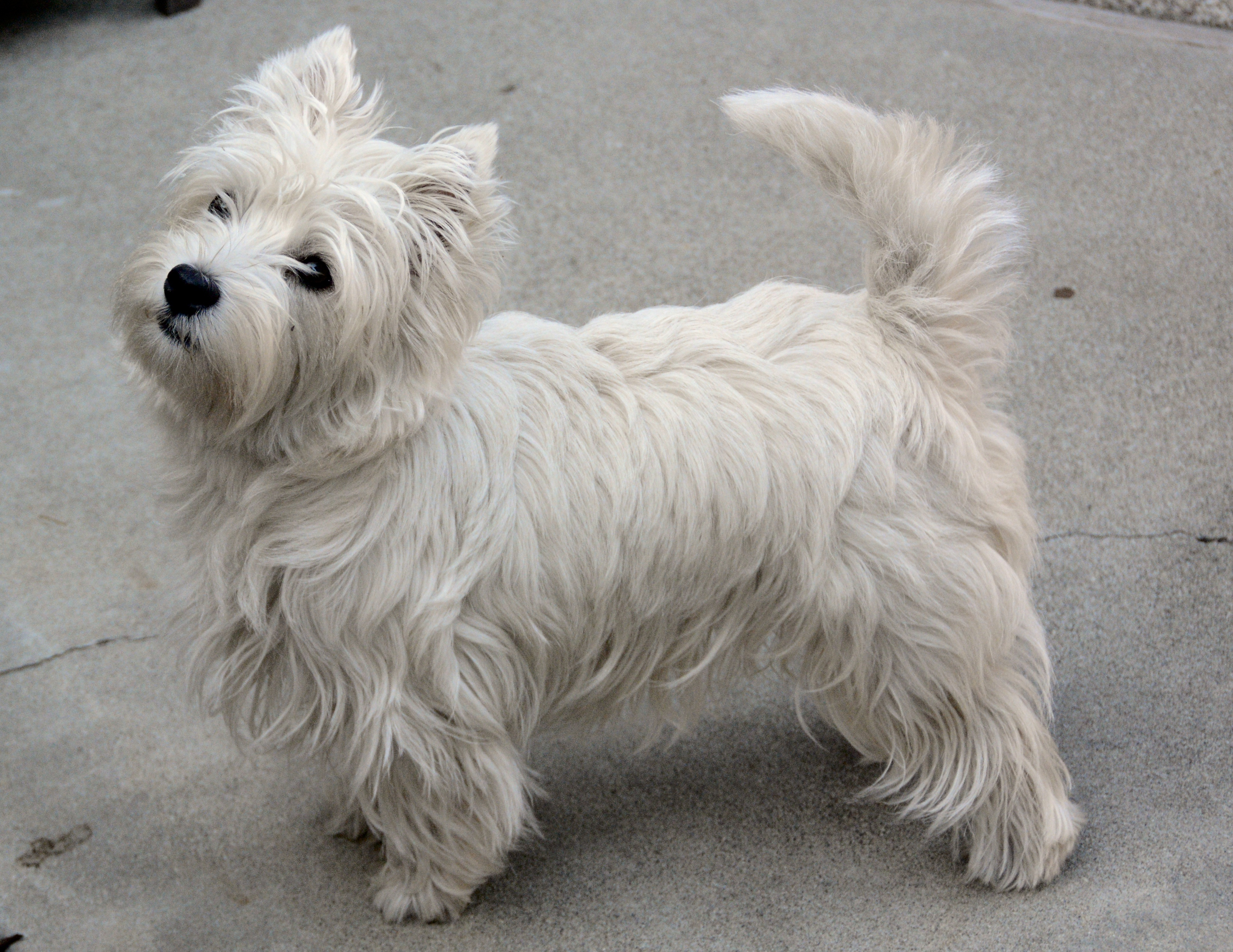
Westies have a thick undercoat and smooth outer coat

Westies commonly have bright, deep-set, almond-shaped eyes that are dark in colour. Their ears are pointed and erect. Westies typically weigh between 15 and 20 pounds (6.8 and 9.1 kg) with an average height between 10–11 inches (25–28 cm) at the withers. The body should be shorter than the height of the dog at the shoulder.

Westies have a black nose, deep chest, muscular limbs, and a short closely-fitted jaw with "scissors" bite (lower canines locked in front of upper canines, upper incisors locked over lower incisors). Their paws are slightly turned out to give them better grip than flat-footed breeds when they climb on rocky surfaces. Young puppies have pink markings on the nose and footpads that slowly turn black as they age. Westies also have short and sturdy tails.

Westies have a rough outer coat that can grow to about 2 inches (5.1 cm) long and a soft, thick undercoat. The fur fills out the face to give it a rounded appearance. As puppies develop into adults, their coarse outer coat is normally removed by either "hand-stripping" (especially for dog-showing) or otherwise clipping. Most Westies are pure white, although there are some light wheat colour variations.

== Temperament ==
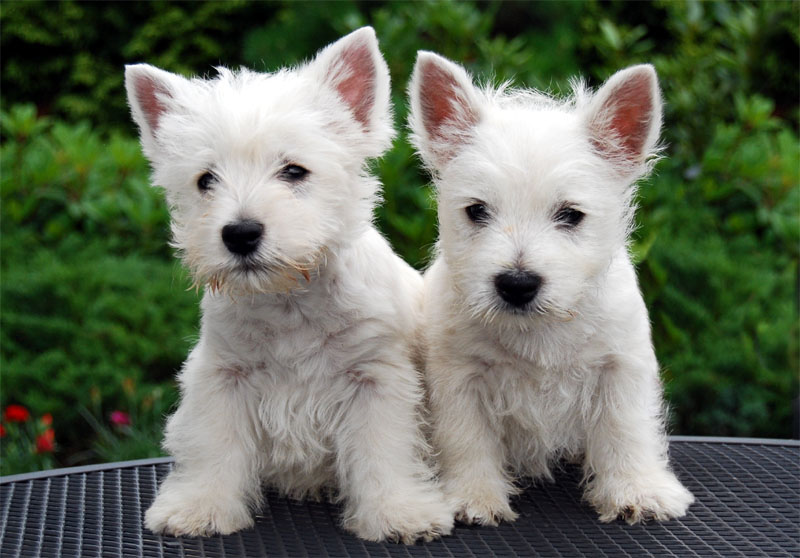
Two Westie puppies

The temperament of Westies can vary greatly, with some being friendly towards children and others preferring solitude. They will not typically tolerate rough handling, such as a child pulling on their ears or fur, and can frequently be both food- and toy-possessive. This makes regular training from a young age particularly important. Westies can make good watchdogs and are normally independent, self-assured, and confident. They are loyal and bond with their owner but are often on the move, requiring a minimum of one hour of daily exercise. Westies are highly social and are the most friendly of all the Scottish terriers.

A hardy breed, Westies can be stubborn and cause issues with training, potentially requiring their training to be refreshed on occasion during their lifetime. Having a typical terrier prey drive, they tend to be highly interested in toys, especially chasing balls. They retain the instincts of an "earthdog" such as being inquisitive and investigative, as well as natural instincts to bark and dig holes. Westies are tied for 47th place (with the Scottish Deerhound) in Stanley Coren's 1994 book The Intelligence of Dogs, which designates them as being of "average working/obedience intelligence" and places them almost exactly in the middle of the list.

== Health ==
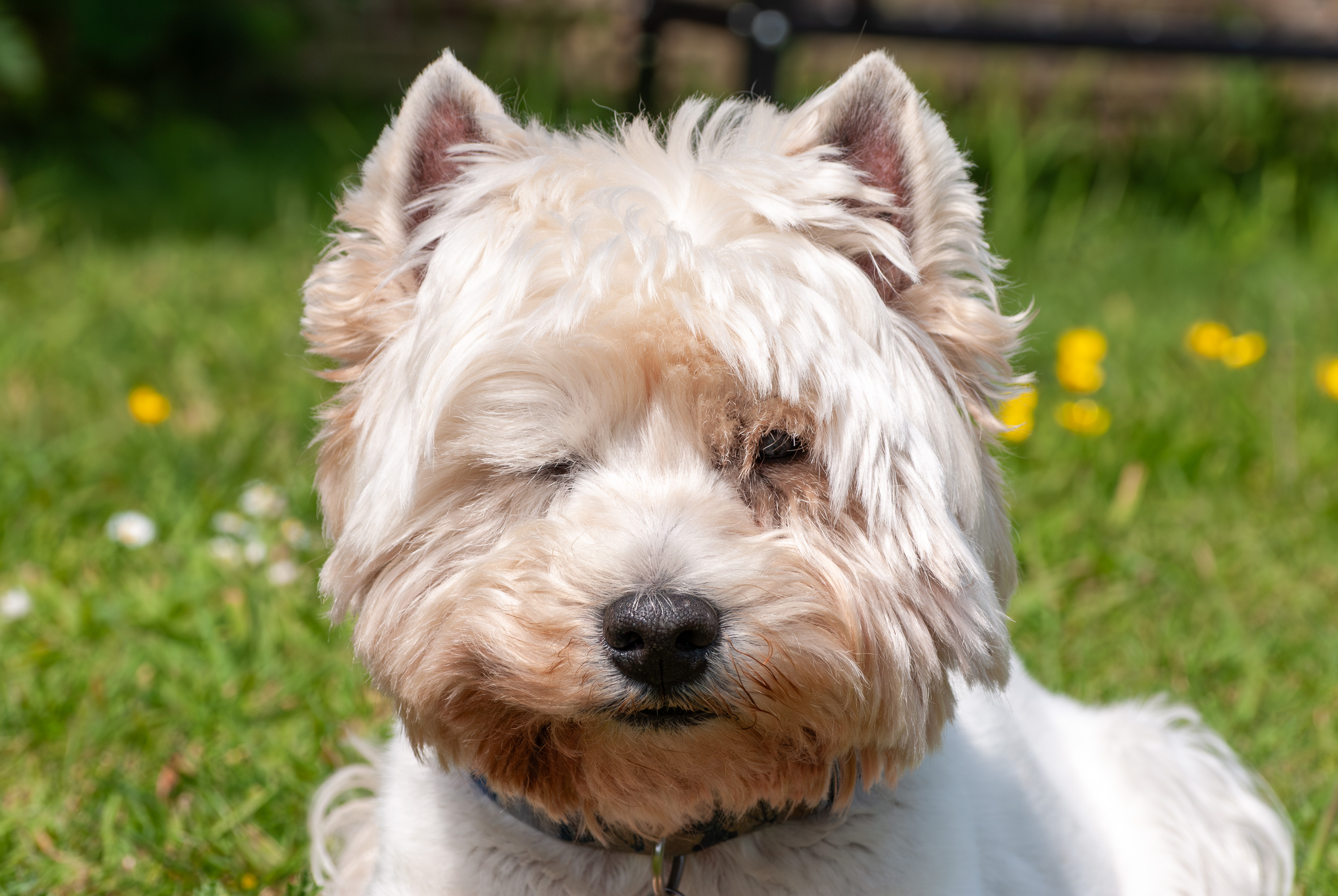
Face of a 15-year-old Westie

A 2015 French study found a life expectancy of 12.93 years, while a 2024 British study found a life expectancy of 13.4 years (averaging 12.7 years for purebreeds and 12 years for crossbreeds). The typical litter size is between three and five puppies.

The breed is pre-disposed to conditions found in many breeds, such as abdominal hernias. Craniomandibular osteopathy is a disease that most commonly affects West Highland White Terriers. The disease is an autosomal recessive condition, so a puppy can only be affected by it if both of its parents are carriers of the faulty gene. The condition appears across many breeds, including several different types of terriers, as well as other unrelated breeds such as the Great Dane. It typically appears in dogs under one year old, and can cause problems for the dog to chew or swallow food. Radiographic testing can be conducted to diagnose the condition, in which the bones around the jaw thicken; additionally, the blood may show increased calcium levels and enzyme levels. The condition often stops progressing by the time the dog is a year old, and in some cases can recede. It is normally treated with anti-inflammatory medications, and the feeding of soft foods. In some cases, tube feeding may be necessary.

The breed is prone to skin disorders. About one quarter of Westies surveyed are affected by atopic dermatitis, a heritable chronic allergic skin condition. A higher proportion of males are affected compared to females. An uncommon but severe breed-specific skin condition, hyperplastic dermatosis, may affect West Highland White Terriers of any age. Affected dogs can suffer from red hyperpigmentation, lichenification, and alopecia. In the initial stages, this condition can be misdiagnosed as an allergy or less serious forms of dermatitis.

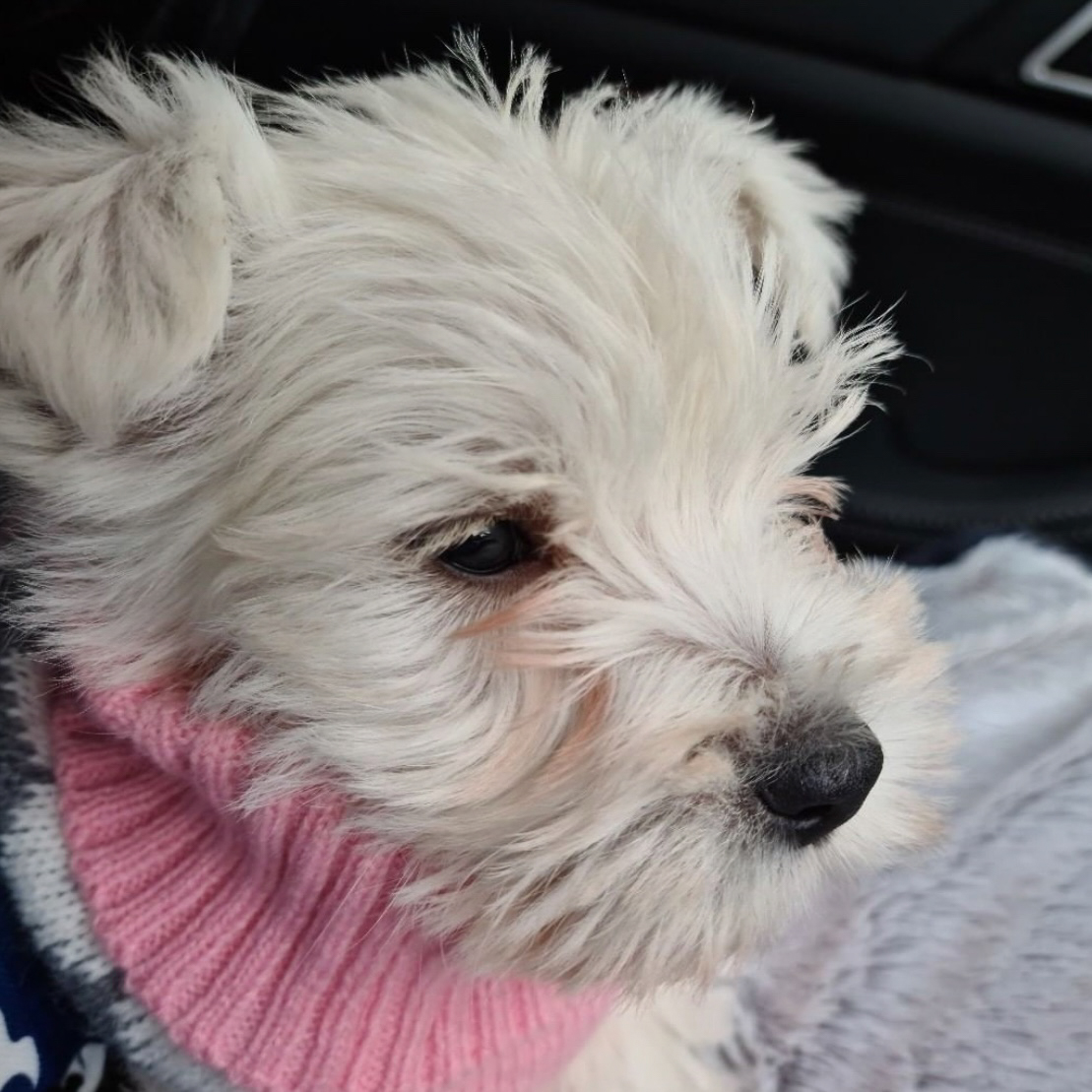
Westie puppy

An inherited genetic problem that exists in the breed is globoid cell leukodystrophy. It is not breed-specific, and can appear in Cairn Terriers and other breeds including Beagles and Pomeranians. It is a neurological disease wherein the dog lacks the enzyme galactosylceramidase. The symptoms are noticeable as the puppy develops, and can be identified by the age of 30 weeks. Affected dogs have tremors, muscle weakness, and trouble walking. Symptoms slowly increase until limb paralysis begins to occur. Due to it being a hereditary condition, owners should avoid breeding affected animals to eliminate it from the breed. Another genetic condition that affects the breed is "white dog shaker syndrome". As this condition is most commonly found in Westies and Maltese, the condition was originally thought to be connected to the genes for white coats, but the same condition has since been found in other non-white breeds including the Yorkshire Terrier and the Dachshund. The condition typically develops over one to three days, resulting in tremors of the head and limbs, ataxia, and hypermetria. Affected males and females can be affected for different lengths of time, with symptoms in females lasting between four and six weeks, while males can be affected the rest of their lives.

Other less common conditions which appear in the breed include hydroxyglutaric aciduria, which is where elevated levels of Alpha-Hydroxyglutaric acid are in the dog's urine, blood plasma, and spinal fluid. It can cause seizures, muscle stiffness, and ataxia, but is more commonly found in Staffordshire Bull Terriers. A degeneration of the hip joint, known as Legg–Calvé–Perthes syndrome, also occurs in the breed. However, the chances of this condition occurring are much higher in some other breeds, such as the Australian Shepherd and the Miniature Pincher. The breed is also one of the least likely to be affected by a luxating patella, where the knee cap slips out of place. The breed is predisposed to atopic dermatitis.

Hyperplastic dermatosis of the West Highland White Terrier, also known as epidermal dysplasia or colloquially Armadillo Westie Syndrome, is an uncommon condition exclusively identified in the Westie. It is a severe chronic hyperplastic dermatological disease that is similar to seborrhoeic dermatitis and primary seborrhoea. Due to the fact that it is identified only in Westies, and evidence of familial involvement, it is believed to be an inherited trait. Malassezia infection is associated with the onset or worsening of symptoms. Symptoms involve generalised and serious patches of alopecia, erythema, lichenification, hyperpigmentation, malodor, otitis externa, and pruritus.

A 2021 British study looking at clinical records found predispositions to chronic hepatitis and hepatocellular death, caused by either toxins or acute liver failure; compared to other dogs, Westies are 3.23 times more likely to contract chronic hepatitis and 3.87 times more likely to contract hepatocellular death. Copper storage diseases which affect the breed can result in chronic hepatitis.

== History ==
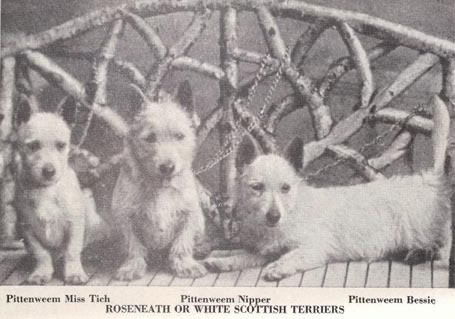
Three Pittenweem Terriers, photographed in 1899

Scottish white terriers were recorded as early as during the reign of James VI of Scotland, who reigned between 1567 and 1625. The king ordered that a dozen of these white terriers be procured from Argyll to be presented to the Kingdom of France as a gift. Sandy- and brindle-coloured dogs were seen as hardier than those of other colours, and white dogs were seen as being weak. At various times during the breed's existence, it has been considered a white offshoot of both the Scottish Terrier and the Cairn Terrier breeds.

Reports of a ship from the Spanish Armada being wrecked on the island of Skye in 1588 indicated the ship carried white Spanish dogs, whose descendants were kept distinct from other breeds by Clan Donald, including the families of the Chiefs. Other families on Skye preserved both white and sandy-coloured dogs. One such family was the Clan MacLeod, and it was reported by their descendants that at least two Chiefs kept white terriers, including "The Wicked Man" Norman MacLeod, and his grandson Norman, who became Chief after his death.

George Campbell, 8th Duke of Argyll, chief of Clan Campbell, bred a breed of white Scottish terriers known as the "Roseneath Terrier". Another breed of white Scottish terriers also appeared at this point, with Dr. Americ Edwin Flaxman from Fife developing his line of "Pittenweem Terriers" out of a female Scottish Terrier which produced white offspring. The dog seemed to produce these white puppies regardless of the sire to which she was bred, and after drowning over 20 of these offspring, he came upon the theory that it was an ancient trait of the Scottish Terrier that was trying to reappear. He re-dedicated his breeding programme to produce white Scottish Terriers with the aim of restoring it to the same stature as the dark-coloured breed. Flaxman is credited with classes being added to dog shows for white Scottish Terriers towards the end of the 19th century.

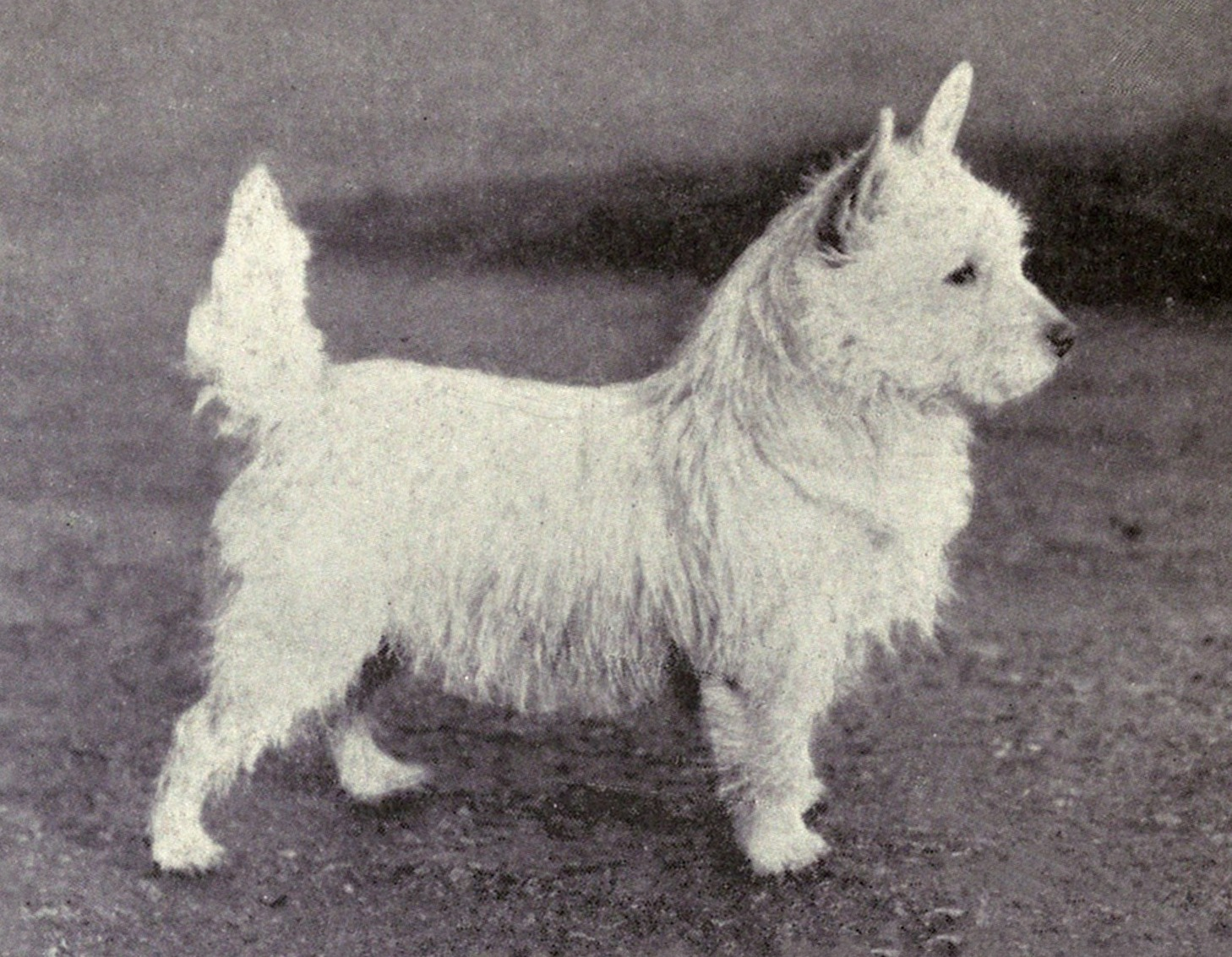
A West Highland White Terrier, photographed in 1915

The person most closely associated with developing the modern breed of West Highland White Terrier is Edward Donald Malcolm, 16th Laird of Poltalloch. Malcolm owned terriers used to work game; the story told is that a reddish-brown terrier was mistaken for a fox and shot. Following this, Malcolm decided to develop a white terrier breed, which became known as the "Poltalloch Terrier". The first generation of Poltallochs had sandy-coloured coats, and had already developed prick ears, which is a trait seen later in the modern breed. It is unknown if the Poltalloch Terriers and Pittenweem Terriers were interbred. In 1903, Malcolm declared that he did not want to be known as the creator of the breed and insisted that his breed of white terriers be renamed. The term "West Highland White Terrier" first appears in Otters and Otter Hunting by L.C.R. Cameron, published in 1908.

The first breed club was set up in 1904; Niall Campbell, 10th Duke of Argyll, was the society's first president. A second club was subsequently set up, with the Countess of Aberdeen as chairman. Edward Malcolm succeeded the Countess as the club's second chairman. Kennel Club recognition followed in 1907, and the breed appeared at Crufts for the first time in the same year. The Westie was imported into the United States in 1907–1908, when Robert Goelet imported Ch. Kiltie and Ch. Rumpus Glenmohr. Initially, it was also known at the time as the Roseneath Terrier, and the Roseneath Terrier Club was recognised by the American Kennel Club in 1908. The club was renamed during the following year to the West Highland White Terrier Club of America. The breed spent the period that immediately followed as being "in vogue", becoming popular almost immediately upon its arrival in the US. Canadian Kennel Club recognition followed in 1909. Until 1924 in the UK, Westie pedigrees were allowed to have Cairn and Scottish Terriers in them. By the time of Malcolm's death in 1930, a stable type had appeared with prick ears, a white coat, and a short back.

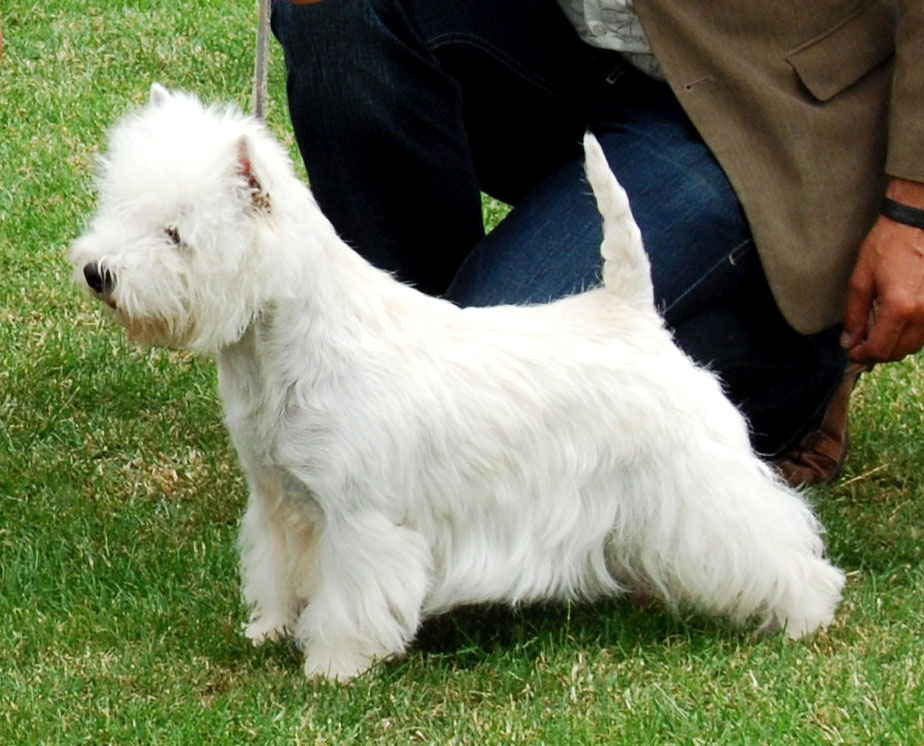
A Westie in a modern show-cut

In major conformation shows, the breed has been equally successful on both sides of the Atlantic. The first member of the breed to win a show championship was Ch. Morvan in 1905, owned by Colin Young. The dog was registered at the time as a Scottish Terrier, and won the title at the Scottish Kennel Club show at the age of seven months. Because the breed was not yet recognised independently, the championship title was not retained when the dog was reregistered as a West Highland White Terrier. The first win at a major show came at the Westminster Kennel Club Dog Show in 1942 when Constance Winant's Ch. Wolvey Pattern of Edgerstoune won the title of Best in Show. The same title was taken by Barbara Worcester's Ch. Elfinbrook Simon in 1962. It took a further 14 years before the breed took its first Best in Show title at Crufts, the UK's major dog show. Ch. Dianthus Buttons, owned by Kath Newstead and Dorothy Taylor, took the title for the breed in 1976. A Westie also won Crufts in 1990 with the Best in Show title going to Derek Tattersall's Ch. Olac Moon Pilot, and in 2016 to Burneze Geordie Girl.

The popularity of the breed during the early 20th century was such that dogs were being exchanged for hundreds of guineas. As of 2010, the Westie is the third-most popular breed of terrier in the UK, with 5,361 puppies registered with the Kennel Club. However, this is a decrease in numbers since 2001, when it was the most popular terrier breed, with 11,019 new dogs registered. The breed's position in the United States is more stable with it remaining in the top third of all breeds since around 1960. It was ranked 30th-most popular in 2001, based on registrations with the American Kennel Club, which varied around the 30s in the decade after, with it ranked 34th in 2010. It was the 41st-most popular AKC breed in 2024.
