= Tickle Em Jock =

Ch. Tickle Em Jock
- Ch. Tickle Em Jock
- Species: Canis lupus familiaris
- Breed: Scottish Terrier
- Sex: Male
- Born: 1908; London
- Occupation: Show dog
- Title: Best In Show at the Westminster Dog Show
- Term: 1911–1912
- Predecessor: Ch. Sabine Rarebit (Smooth Fox Terrier)
- Successor: Ch. Kenmare Sorceress (Airedale Terrier)
- Owner: Andrew Albright Jr.

Ch. Tickle Em Jock (1908–??), a Scottish Terrier, was the first of his breed to win best-in-show at the Westminster Kennel Club Dog Show in 1911, the fifth occasion it was awarded. He was originally sold for a sum of only £2 to Andrew Albright, Jr. Mr Albright would go on to later say he wouldn't sell the dog for $5,000. Jock was also noted in the media of the time for biting a judge's wrist just after winning best of breed at a dog show.

== Early life ==
Jock was originally sold at Leadenhall Meat Market in London in 1909 for £2 ($15), as he was originally owned by a butcher. Samuel Wilson of Bradford, Yorkshire purchased the dog and paid extra for evidence of the dog's pedigree. Jock was shown around some minor English summer shows with some success, where he was seen by Andrew Albright, Jr. In 1910, Mr. Albright purchased the dog and brought him to America.

== Show history ==
Jock was entered in the Westminster Kennel Club Dog Show in 1911 at the age of 3 years old, and was successful, becoming the first Scottish Terrier to win best-in-show and the first non-Smooth Fox Terrier to win. More than 2,000 dogs were entered at the event and Jock's appearance was criticized by other exhibitors, being described as "lacking the qualities of a typical Scottish Terrier". The reserve was another importation from the United Kingdom, an Airedale Terrier named Prince of York. Following the victory, his owner Mr. Albright said that nothing less than $5,000 would cause him to part with his champion. A Scottish Terrier would not go on to win best-in-show at Westminster again until Ch. Shieling's Signature in 1945.

Following his victory in the breed class at the Monmouth County Kennel Club show in 1911, he began to fight with the runner up and judge's reserve selection, Walescott Invader. During the tussle, the judge, H. Hildebrand Wilson intervened and was severely bitten by Jock. There were suggestions at the time that the incident was caused by Mr. Wilson, as the two dogs were in the ring awaiting his return from showing his Airedale Terrier in another part of the show ground.

== See also ==
- List of individual dogs
