= Scotty Cramp =

Dog disease

Scottie Cramp is a disease in Scottish Terriers causing spasms and hyperflexion and hyperextension of the legs. It is caused by a disorder in serotonin metabolism that causes a deficiency of available serotonin. It is inherited as an autosomal recessive trait.

Scotty Cramp occurs in puppies and young dogs. Symptoms present after exercise or excitement and last a few minutes. A goose-stepping gait and arched spine are often seen, and the dog may turn somersaults as it runs. The symptoms usually resolve after ten minutes, but they may repeat several times in a day. Episodes of Scottie Cramp can also be triggered by added stress on the dog. At this time there is no known genetic testing available for Scottie Cramp, even though this is considered a genetic disease. To diagnose Scottie Cramp, the veterinarian will perform a physical exam, a complete blood count, a biochemistry profile, and a urinalysis of the dog. If the diagnosis is unsure, a dose of methysergide can be given. In affected dogs, this will block serotonin and increase the frequency and severity of the symptoms. Diazepam or acepromazine is used to control the symptoms of Scotty Cramp. Moreover, Fluoxetine (0.8-4mg/kg daily), a SSRI (selective serotonin reuptake inhibitor), has shown to be effective and can be tried without the expensive biochemistry profile/urinalysis, etc. Vitamin E may also be of some benefit. Because Scotty Cramp is inherited, affected dogs and their parents and siblings should not be bred.
