= Tucker Budzyn =

American dog social media influencer (2018–2026)

- A photo of Budzyn
- Species: Dog
- Breed: Golden Retriever
- Sex: Male
- Born: May 3, 2018; Michigan, U.S.
- Died: September 2, 2026 (aged 8); Michigan, U.S.
- Occupation: Social media influencer
- Owners: Courtney Budzyn; Mike Budzyn
- Mate: Journee (died 2024)
- Offspring: 3

Tucker Budzyn (May 3, 2018 – September 2, 2026) was an American Golden Retriever best known for his social media content. At the time of his death, he had more than 27 million followers. A picture book attributed to him, Of All the Sniffs I Love the Most, was released posthumously on November 17, 2026.

== History ==
=== Adoption ===
Tucker Budzyn was born on May 3, 2018, and was taken home by Courtney Budzyn, a house cleaner, and Mike Budzyn in June 2018. He resided in Michigan.

=== Social media activities ===
On the day he was taken home, his social media account was created. He first went viral about a month later, with a video in which he was pawing at an ice cube. By 2020, he had reached more than 60,000 followers on social media. He was awarded Pet Influencer of the Year at the American Influencer Awards in 2021. His owners left their jobs to run his social media.

As of 2023, his account was making more than a million dollars per year for his owners from brand placements and promotions. He went even more viral for a video of his owners renting out a pool for him to swim in during February 2025. A further viral reel was of him getting his fur curled.

His partner was Journee, a fellow golden retriever who died from lymphoma in 2024. He had a son, Todd, whom he first met in 2021 in another viral video and who featured in many social media videos along with him. He selected his son's name by pressing a button.

A picture book stated to be written by him, Of All the Sniffs I Love the Most, was released posthumously on November 17, 2026.

=== Health and death ===
On August 30, 2026, Courtney announced Tucker had been diagnosed with lymphoma two weeks before in a social media post, and stated her hope that it would be the last sad video she would ever have to make. She also stated he was already in partial remission.

On September 5, 2026, Courtney announced Tucker had died three days prior from an infection caused by the cancer. At the time of his death, he had 27 million followers across social media, many of whom subsequently took to social media to mourn him.
