= TMBIM4 =

Protein-coding gene in humans

Identifiers
- Aliases: TMBIM4, GAAP, LFG4, S1R, ZPRO, CGI-119, transmembrane BAX inhibitor motif containing 4
- External IDs: OMIM: 616874; MGI: 1915462; GeneCards: TMBIM4

Gene location (Human)
Chr.	Chromosome 12 (human)
Band	12q14.3	Start	66,135,846 bp
Band	12q14.3	End	66,170,027 bp

Gene location (Mouse)
Chr.	Chromosome 10 (mouse)
Band	10|10 D2	Start	120,037,495 bp
Band	10|10 D2	End	120,060,822 bp
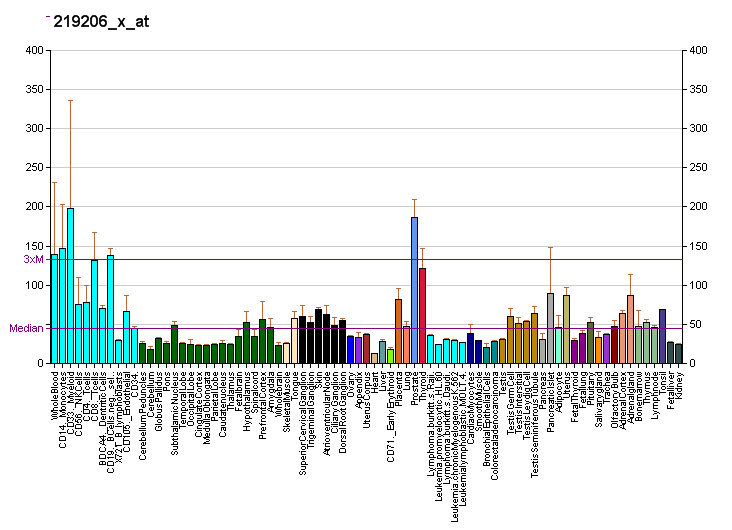
RNA expression pattern
Bgee	Human / Mouse (ortholog); Top expressed in: buccal mucosa cell; monocyte; Achilles tendon; body of pancreas; right lung; left adrenal gland; left testis; right testis; right adrenal gland; right adrenal cortex / Top expressed in: right kidney; interventricular septum; yolk sac; human kidney; seminal vesicula; proximal tubule; granulocyte; neural layer of retina; spermatocyte; spermatid; More reference expression data
BioGPS	More reference expression data
Gene ontology
Molecular function	protein binding
Cellular component	integral component of membrane; Golgi apparatus; Golgi membrane; Golgi stack; membrane
Biological process	regulation of calcium-mediated signaling; negative regulation of apoptotic process; apoptotic process
Sources:Amigo / QuickGO
Orthologs
Databases	NCBI: entry; OMA: entry
Species	Human	Mouse
Entrez	51643	68212
Ensembl	ENSG00000155957	ENSMUSG00000020225
UniProt	Q9HC24	Q9DA39
RefSeq (mRNA)	NM_016056; NM_001282606; NM_001282609; NM_001282610	NM_026617
RefSeq (protein)	NP_001269535; NP_001269538; NP_001269539; NP_057140; NP_001269535.1	NP_080893
Location (UCSC)	Chr 12: 66.14 – 66.17 Mb	Chr 10: 120.04 – 120.06 Mb
PubMed search
- Wikidata
View/Edit Human	View/Edit Mouse

Transmembrane BAX inhibitor motif-containing protein 4 is a protein that in humans is encoded by the TMBIM4 gene. It is also known as human Golgi anti-apoptotic protein (hGAAP) due to its function and sub-cellular localization.

== Function ==
Human GAAP is a protein present in the Golgi that helps regulate apoptosis, a form of programmed cell death. By regulating the fluxes of Ca^{+2}, an increase of GAAP can help prevent apoptosis. GAAP is also involved in promoting cell migration and has been identified as a novel Golgi cation channel. Other GAAPs can be found in all eucaryotes analyzed and in some bacteria. A viral GAAP (vGAAP) can also be found in some strains of vaccinia virus, the live vaccine used to eradicate smallpox.

== See also ==
- Ion channel
