= Cairn Terrier =

Scottish dog breed

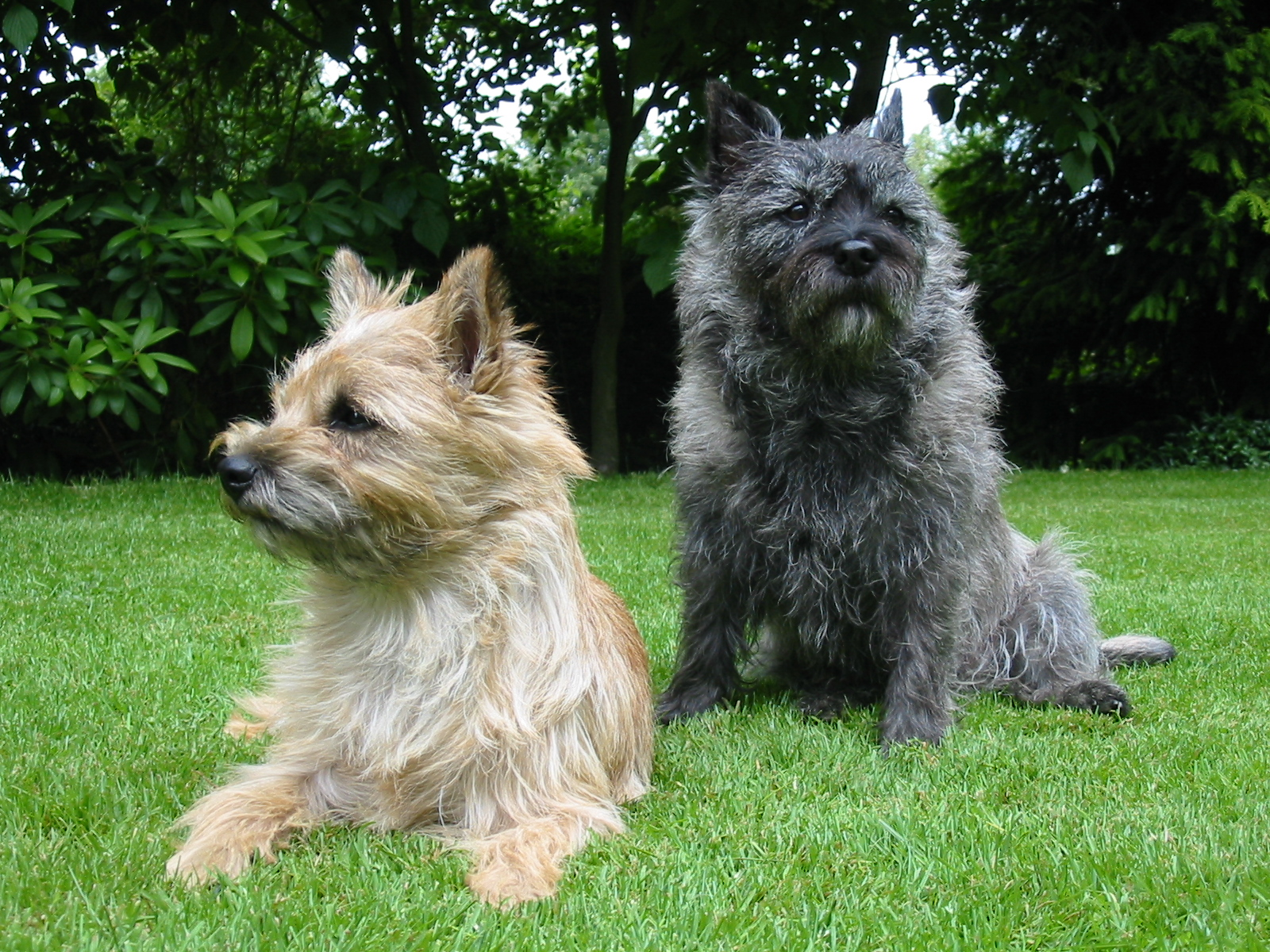
- Origin: Scotland
Traits
- Height: 28–31 cm (11–12 in)
- Weight: 6–7.5 kg (13–17 lb)
- Coat: abundant shaggy outer coat, soft downy undercoat
- Colour: cream, deep red, brindle, light grey, apricot or black
Kennel club standards
- The Kennel Club: standard
- Fédération Cynologique Internationale: standard

The Cairn Terrier is a terrier breed originating in the Scottish Highlands and recognised as one of Scotland's earliest working dogs.

The name "Cairn Terrier" was a compromise suggestion when the breed was brought to official shows in the United Kingdom in 1909, initially under the name "Short-haired Skye terrier". This name was not accepted by the Kennel Club when faced with opposition from breeders of the Skye Terrier. The alternative name Cairn Terrier was adopted.

== History ==
Cairn Terriers originated in the Scottish Highlands and the Isle of Skye. Prior to 1873, terriers in Scotland were collectively referred to as 'Scottish Terriers'. In the early days of the breed's establishment, the name 'short haired Skye Terrier' was used. After concerns raised by the Skye Terrier Club, the name 'Cairn Terrier' was given to the breed instead. The name 'Cairn Terrier' comes from cairns, where the terriers often flushed out vermin.

The Cairn Terrier was registered into the American Kennel Club in 1903. The Kennel Club of the United Kingdom gave the Cairn Terrier a separate register in 1912; the first year of recognition, 134 were registered, and the breed was given Championship status. While registration of white Cairns was once permitted, after 1917, the American Kennel Club required them to be registered as West Highland White Terriers. The dog was definitively accepted by the Fédération Cynologique Internationale in 1963. However, the breed has fallen out of fashion in recent years, leading the breed to be classed as a Vulnerable Native Breed to UK by the Kennel Club.

== Description ==
The Cairn Terrier has a harsh, weather-resistant outer coat that can be black, cream, wheaten, red, sandy, gray, or brindled. Pure black, black and tan, and white are not permitted by many kennel clubs. A notable characteristic of Cairns is that brindled Cairns frequently change colour throughout their lifetimes. It is not uncommon for a brindled Cairn to become progressively more black or silver as it ages. The Cairn is double-coated, with a soft, dense undercoat and a harsh outer coat. A well-groomed Cairn has a rough-and-ready appearance.

Cairn Terriers tend to look similar to Norwich Terriers, but with some differences (for example the shaggy fur). The outer layer of fur is shaggy, but they have a soft, downy undercoat. The ideal height is roughly 28–31 cm, with weight in proportion, usually some 6–7.5 kg However, this can vary depending on size.

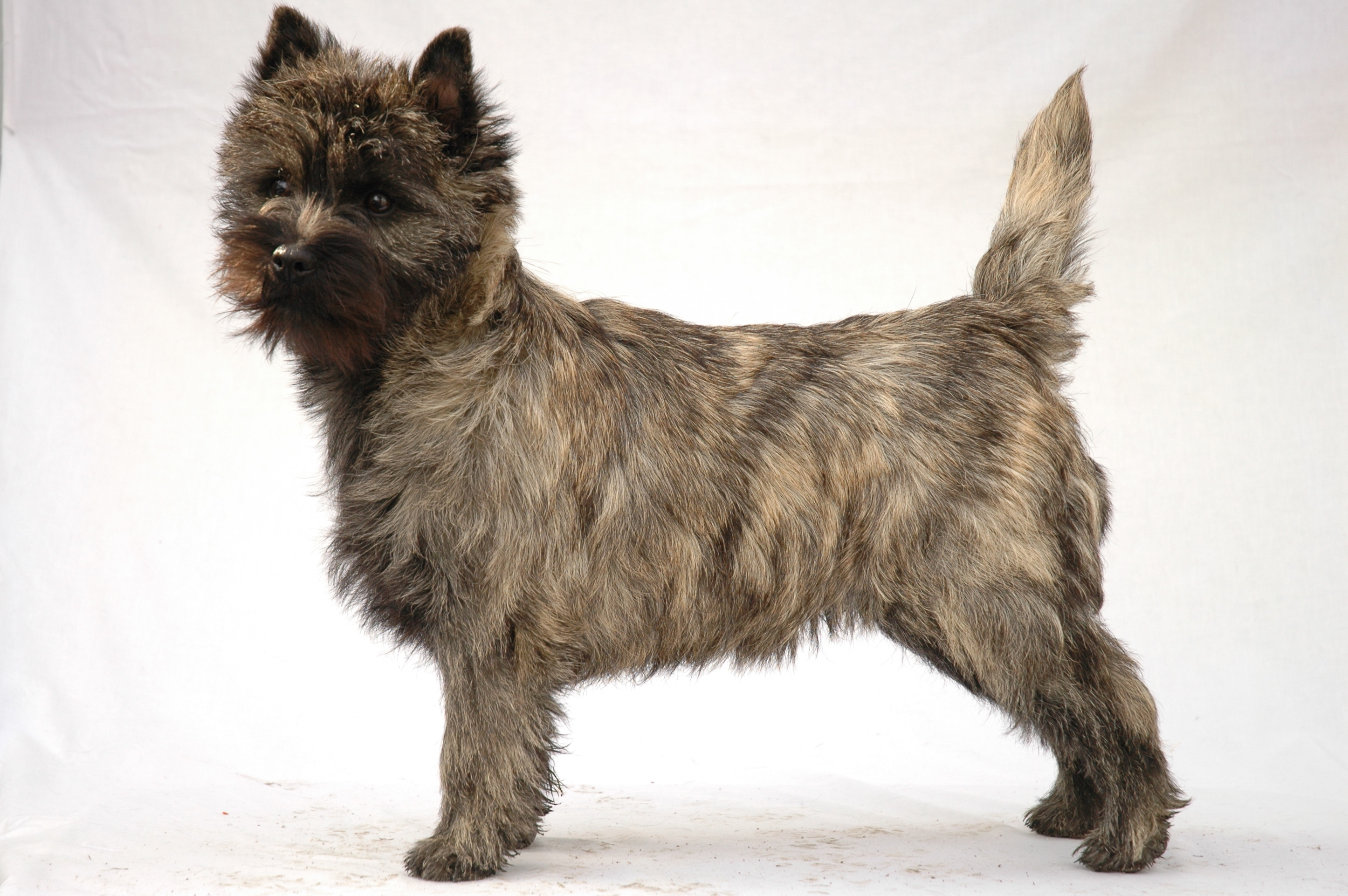
Brindle

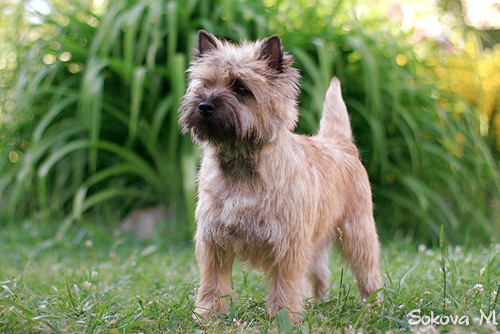
Red/wheaten

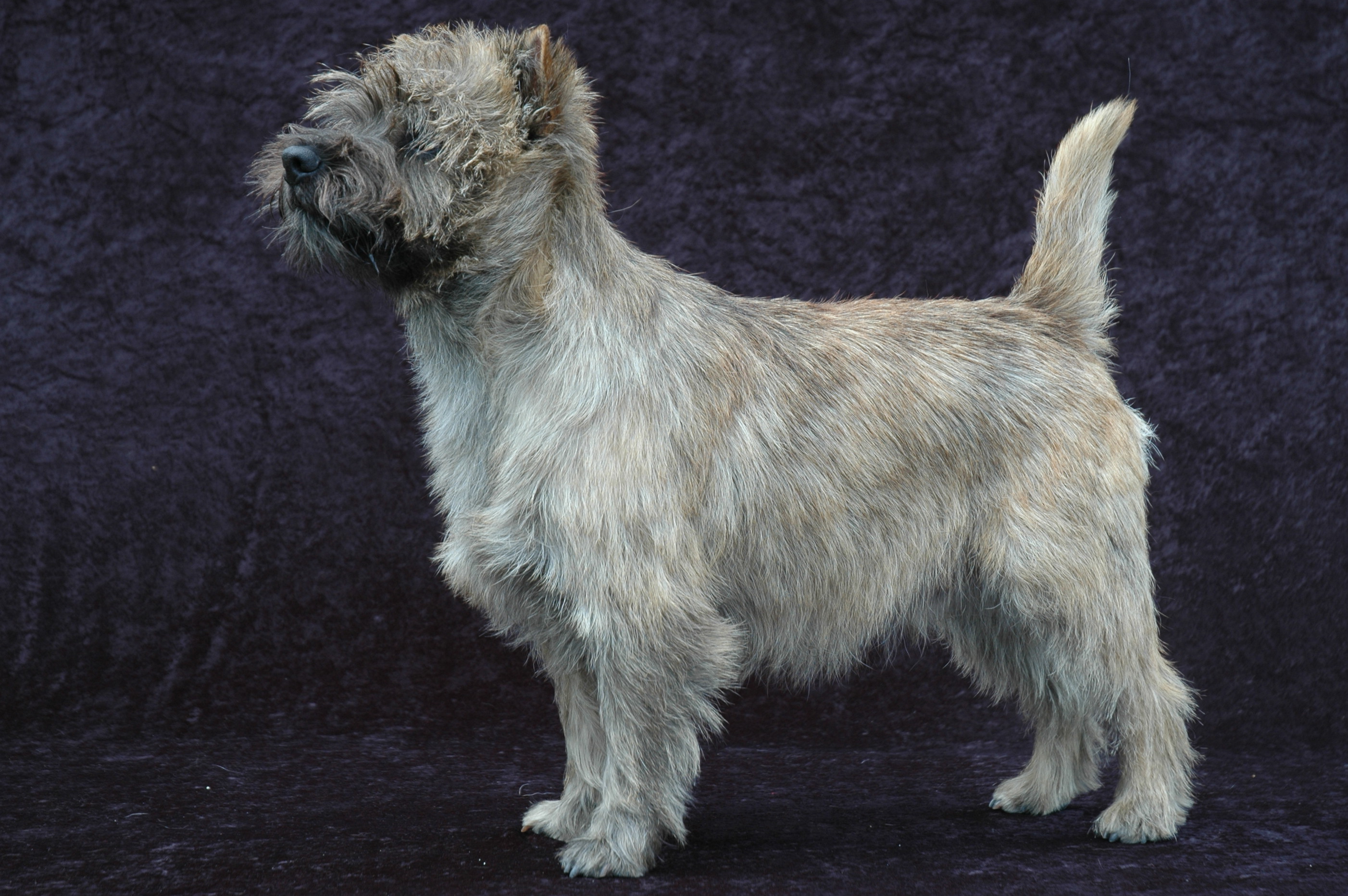

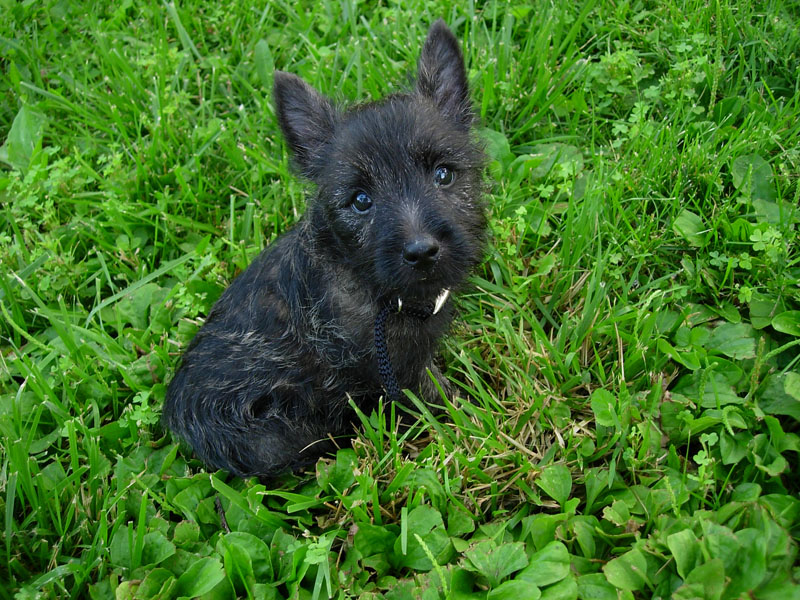
A nine-week-old puppy

== Health ==
A 2015 French study found a life expectancy of 13.42 years. A 2024 UK study found a life expectancy of 14 years for the breed compared to an average of 12.7 for purebreeds and 12 for crossbreeds.

Some of the more common hereditary health problems found in the Cairn are:

- Bronchoesophageal fistula
- Cataracts
- Corneal dystrophy
- Craniomandibular osteopathy (lion jaw)
- Diabetes mellitus
- Entropion
- Hip dysplasia
- Hypothyroidism
- Krabbe disease (globoid cell leukodystrophy)
- Legg–Calvé–Perthes disease
- Lens luxation
- Luxating patella
- Ocular melanosis
- Portosystemic shunt
- Progressive retinal atrophy
- Soft-tissue sarcoma
- Von Willebrand disease

The breed is predisposed to atopic dermatitis.
