= Craniomandibular osteopathy =

Skeletal disease in dogs

Craniomandibular osteopathy, also known as lion's jaw, is a developmental disease in dogs causing extensive bony changes in the mandible and skull. In this disease, a cyclical resorption of normal bone and replacement by immature bone occurs along the inner and outer surfaces of the affected bones. It usually occurs between the ages of 3 and 6 months. Breeds most commonly affected include the West Highland White Terrier, Scottish Terrier, Cairn Terrier, and Boston Terrier. It is rare in large-breed dogs, but it has been reported.

== Causes ==
Craniomandibular osteopathy is an inherited disease, and has been recognised as an autosomal recessive trait of the West Highland White Terrier. Canine distemper has also been indicated as a possible cause, as has E. coli infection, which could be why it is seen occasionally in large-breed dogs.

== Signs and symptoms ==
Common clinical signs include lethargy, anorexia, and mild pyrexia. Specific symptoms are the enlargement of the mandibular lymph nodes and atrophy of the temporalis muscle. The disease limits the ability of the dog to open its mouth, leading to anorexia and adipsia, which in turn leads to dehydration and emaciation.

== Calvarial hyperostotic syndrome ==
A similar disease seen in young Bullmastiffs is known as calvarial hyperostotic syndrome. It is also similar to human infantile cortical hyperostosis. It is characterized by irregular, progressive bony proliferation and thickening of the cortical bone of the calvaria, which is part of the skull. Asymmetry of the lesions may occur, which makes it different from craniomandibular osteopathy. Symptoms include painful swelling of the skull, fever, and lymph node swelling. In most cases it is self-limiting.
