= Timeline of aging research =

This timeline lists notable events in the history of research into senescence or biological aging, including the research and development of life extension methods, brain aging delay methods and rejuvenation.

People have long been interested in making their lives longer and healthier. The most ancient Egyptian, Indian and Chinese books contain reasoning about aging. Ancient Egyptians used garlic in large quantities to extend their lifespan. Hippocrates (c. 460 – c. 370 BCE), in his Aphorisms, and Aristotle (384–322 BCE), in On youth and old age, expressed their opinions about reasons for old age and gave advice about lifestyle. Medieval Persian physician Ibn Sina (c. 980 – 1037), known in the West as Avicenna, summarized the achievements of earlier generations about this issue.

== Background ==
Descriptions of rejuvenation and immortality remedies are often found in the writings of alchemists. But all those remedies did not allow even alchemists themselves to live longer than a hundred years.

Though the average lifespan of people through the past millennia increased significantly, maximum lifespan almost did not change - even in ancient times there were fairly well and unbiasedly documented cases when some people lived for more than a hundred years (for example, Terentia who lived 103 or 104 years). While among the billions of people of the modern world, there is only one case of life over 120 years (Jeanne Calment, 122 years). The super-long lives of people that are mentioned in ancient books, apparently, are highly exaggerated, since archaeological data show that even the oldest of the ancient people lived no more than modern supercentenarians. In some cases the exaggeration, possibly, is not intentional but occurs due to errors in translation between languages and synchronization of chronological systems. The species limit of human life is estimated by scientists at 125–127 years, and even in the most ideal conditions a person will not live longer due to aging of the body.

Some scientists believe that, even if medicine learns how to treat all major diseases, that will increase the average lifespan of people in developed countries by only about 10 years. For example, biogerontologist Leonard Hayflick stated that the natural average lifespan for humans is 92 years. Meanwhile, the life expectancy for Japanese already now is more than 84 years, and for Monaco it is reported to be more than 89 years. It may not be possible to achieve further increases without development of new biomedical technologies and approaches. Searches of various equivalents of the elixir of youth happened yet in ancient times: people hoped to find a miraculous remedy in faraway territories, tried to use magic and alchemy. Scientific and technological attempts began at the end of the 19th century. For their intended purpose, all of them turned out to be inefficient at best, sometimes led to premature death, but they had many useful and sometimes unexpected consequences.

== Timeline ==
=== Ancient ===
- 350 BCE — The Greek philosopher Aristotle, arguably the first philosopher to make a serious attempt to scientifically explain aging, proposes his thesis on aging. He suggests that aging is a process by which human and animal bodies, which are naturally hot and wet, gradually become dry and cold, and theorizes that more moisture delays aging.
- 259–210 BCE — years of life of the Chinese emperor Qin Shi Huang, who united China under his rule. All his life he persistently searched for an elixir of youth and died trying, presumably taking "pills of immortality", containing mercury.
- 156–87 BCE — years of life of the Chinese emperor Wu of Han, who persistently tried to find a way to achieve immortality, mainly by means of magic. He used services of various magicians. But Wu of Han was not a naive person – he thoroughly rechecked their abilities and if he identified the person as a quack, he executed him.
- 63 BC–14 CE — years of life of Caesar Augustus, the first Roman emperor, who is considered one of the most effective leaders of the Ancient Rome. For him an eternal youth was an obsession. In particular, contrary to the Roman tradition to create statues as realistic as possible, he always ordered to portray himself young. There are many of his "youthful" statues but researchers still do not know how he looked in old age.
- 3rd–17th century — the period of alchemy. There are several directions in alchemy, and it was distributed over a huge territory. But almost everywhere, in one form or another, there was the concept of a "philosopher's stone" – some substance that is able to turn other metals into gold, and when taken internally in small doses, heal all diseases, rejuvenate an old body and even give biological immortality. Alternatively, there were attempts to prepare "pills of immortality". During centuries alchemy gradually transformed to chemistry, in parallel giving birth to many adjacent sciences or enriching them. It is worth noticing the direction of iatrochemistry – a rational direction of alchemy with the main goal of preparing medicinal products. The pioneers of iatrochemistry were Paracelsus (1493–1541), Jan Baptist van Helmont (1580–1644) and Franciscus Sylvius (1614–1672). The converging field of alchemy was transformed into pharmacy.
- 1513 — searching for the Fountain of Youth is in popular culture thought to be one of the purposes of the expedition of the Spanish conquistador Juan Ponce de León, which lead to the discovery of Florida – however, there is no contemporary evidence of this, and this purpose is considered a myth by historians.
- 1550 — a Venetian nobleman Luigi Cornaro published the book The Art of Living Long, describing the style of life for the achievement of longevity. The book was translated into many languages. The English version of the book till the 19th century went through more than 50 editions. The main idea of the book: in order to live many years, you need to live in moderation, eat simply and little. In his youth Cornaro led a free and immoderate life, as a result by the age of 35 he had many health problems. But by changing his lifestyle he was able to live to 98 (1467–1566). (Though it is possible that he exaggerated his age by about 17 years to give his recommendations more weight.)

=== 19th century to WWII ===
From the end of the 19th century, systematic scientific and technical studies began on the processes of slowing down aging and possible rejuvenation. The period of world history between the two world wars is a very complicated, difficult and ambiguous time of world history. In many spheres of life, there were ideas that were radical-bold, but not always intelligent, ethical and moral from the point of view of modern knowledge, foundations and norms. This also affected the aging research, the spirit of which corresponded to the spirit of that time: attempting bold experiments, often on people, intensively implementing in practice treatments that we may now consider ridiculous. Those attempts had both bad and good consequences. But those researches were already scientific. As it often happens in science, it is often difficult to establish priority considering, who was the first person beginning to use one or another approach. Usually the first experiments are done by enthusiasts and have doubtful positive effects. Some researchers work in parallel. Then at some moment the persons emerge who developed the approaches and made them public.

- 1825 The first publication of the Gompertz–Makeham law of mortality that in the simplest form is: p = a + b^{x}. According to the law, the probability of death p is defined as the sum of age-independent component a and the component depending on age b^{x} which with age increases exponentially. If we place organisms in an absolutely protected environment and in this way make the first component negligible, the probability of death will be completely defined by the second component which actually describes the probability to die from aging.
- 1860s Alfred Russel Wallace writes down what is probably the first evolutionary theory of aging. In notes written sometime between 1865 and 1870, he proposed a wear and tear theory of aging, suggesting that older animals which continue to consume resources, competing with their offspring in an environment with limited food, were disfavored by natural selection. Therefore, he suggested that aging was an evolved trait which allowed an organism's descendants to thrive.
- 1882 August Weismann puts forward the wear and tear theory of aging independently of Wallace.
- 1889 Rejuvenation experiment conducted on himself by the French doctor Charles-Édouard Brown-Séquard. He made himself a few subcutaneous injections from the testicles of young dogs and guinea pigs and claimed that the injections were accompanied by significant and long pain, but then he observed an improvement of the physical condition of the organism and increase of mental activity. Experiments of other scientists, at first, produced the same results but later it became clear that the period of reinforced activity is followed by a period of decline. At the moment of the experiment Charles-Édouard Brown-Séquard was 72 years old. After the experiment he claimed he felt as if he became younger by 30 years. However, 5 years later he died. But other doctors picked up this method and it created the foundation for the development of hormone replacement therapy.
- 1903 Ilya Mechnikov coined the term "gerontology". The term originates from the Greek γέρων, geron, "old man" and -λογία, -logia, "study of". From 1897 to 1916 Mechnikov conducted many studies on the effect of acidified dairy products (especially Bulgarian yogurt and bacteria used for its production) on longevity and quality of life in old age. He developed the concept of probiotic diet that promotes long healthy life. In 1908 Mechnikov received the Nobel Prize for his work on immunology (adjacent area of his research). Adhering to his diet, Mechnikov lived a very long life compared to his short-lived relatives.
- 1914 Dr. Frank Lydston from Chicago performed human testis transplants on several patients, including himself, and said that there were some rejuvenating consequences (such as returning his gray hair to its original color and improving of sexual performance). These works remained little known. The work of Leo L. Stanley, that he began to do since 1919, received much more prominence.
- 1915–1917 Experiments to find out the effects of food restriction on the life duration of rats, conducted by Thomas Osborne. Apparently, these were the first systematic experiments in this direction. These experiments remained little known. The method was popularized by Clive McCay in 1934–1935.
- 1910s–1930s Austrian physiologist Eugen Steinach was trying to achieve rejuvenation effects by means of different surgical operations such as partial vasectomy for men, ligation of fallopian tubes for women, transplantation of testicles, etc. And although later these operations were found to be ineffective, they allowed the researchers to recognize the role of the sexual glands and sexual hormones in the formation of the first and secondary sex characteristics, enriched physiology, laid the foundation for the science of sexology, formed the basis for sex reassignment surgeries. From 1921 to 1938, Eugen Steinach was nominated for the Nobel Prize many times (according to various sources, from 6 to 11 times), but never received it.
- 1910s–1930s Numerous experiments for obtaining rejuvenating effects by means of transplantation of organs and tissues. Among the most notable researchers who worked in this direction, there were Alexis Carrel (who developed the technology of anastomosis of blood vessels and advanced asepsis, a Nobel laureate of 1912), Mathieu Jaboulay, Emerich Ullmann, Jacques Loeb, John Northrop, Porfiry Bakhmetiev. And although such interventions were later found to be ineffective for their intended purposes, those works led to the creation of tissue engineering, techniques for cardiopulmonary bypass and dialysis, established the foundation for the technologies for storing organs extracted from a person outside the body (which now are used, for example, during organ donation), the emergence of cryobiology.
- 1920s–1930s In medical practice, sex gland transplants were introduced to obtain rejuvenating effects. (Though separate experiments in this direction were done even earlier, even in antiquity.) The earlier mentioned operations of Dr. Frank Lydston in 1914 remained almost unnoticed. But the works of Leo Leonidas Stanley quickly received widespread scientific notice. Stanley was a physician at a prison in California and began to do these operations since 1919, using glands of executed criminals. In the following years, such operations were done by dozens of physicians (including Eugen Steinach) but they became most famous due to the activity of the French surgeon of Russian extraction Serge/Samuel Voronoff. It was believed that transplantation of sex glands provides more durable effects than injection of a suspension of ground glands. In case of transplantation from human to human, the glands of executed criminals were usually used. But due to a shortage of materials, the sex glands of young healthy monkeys were widely used, which were specially grown for this purpose (usually thin sections of the glands were implanted). In some cases soon after the operation, there were indeed noticeable positive changes in appearance and behavior (with a rapid senility of the body soon following). There were many messages about wonderful results of the operations that, apparently, were false advertising of unscrupulous doctors. But numerous failures became apparent, for which the method was sharply criticized and banned. Serge Voronoff and some other doctors, who claimed producing wonderful results after the operations, got bad reputation. However, despite the failure in the main direction, the conducted research led to the emergence of allotransplantation and xenotransplantation directions in surgery, brought significant knowledge about the effect of sex hormones on the body, stimulated their study. It may be just a coincidence but in 1929–33 several varieties of estrogen were discovered, and testosterone was isolated in 1935. Also these experiments formed the basis for several works of public culture (for example, Heart of a Dog by Mikhail Bulgakov, The Adventure of the Creeping Man from the series about Sherlock Holmes, a song Monkey-Doodle-Doo of Irving Berlin).
- 1926–1928 Experiments on rejuvenation by blood transfusion, conducted by Alexander Bogdanov in the world's first Institute for Blood Transfusion especially created for that purpose. Bogdanov himself died during one of the experiments, because at that time little was known about the factors of blood compatibility of different people. The institute, having undergone several renames, exists and is still actively working. The second head of the institute was Alexander Bogomolets.
- 1930s Beginning of attempts of rejuvenation by methods of cell injections. A special role belongs here to the Swiss physician Paul Niehans – he was not the first but he was the one who developed this approach the most. Among his patients there were many famous people (including Winston Churchill, Charles de Gaulle, Pope Pius XII). So, in 1952, about 3000 injections of about 10 cm^{3} of cell suspension were reported. As a consequence, cell therapy and regenerative medicine were formed. Since the 1960s, attempts have been made to inject not only whole cells but also their constituent parts (such as isolated DNA and RNA). But usage of embryonic drugs sometimes caused serious complications, so the American association of physicians recognized the method of cell therapy as dangerous.
- 1930 The first world's journal about aging and longevity. It was established in Japan and has the name Acta Gerontologica Japonica (Yokufuen Chosa Kenkyu Kiyo).
- 1933 The first institute in the world dedicated to study of aging. It was created in Kishinev (at that time inside the Kingdom of Romania) by Dimu Kotsovsky. Initially the institute was maintained by his own means, and was subsequently recognized by the Romanian government. The name is Romanian: Institutul Pentru Studierea si Combaterea Batranetii = German: Institut für Altersforschung und Altersbekämpfung = Institute for The Study and Combat of Aging.
- 1934 The first widely known scientific publication on the impact of dietary restriction on life expectancy, authored by Clive McCay. McCay's group carried out intensive research in this direction in 1930–43, soon other scientists began to do related research. The effect of increasing life expectancy by starvation is usually observed in rats and mice, whose development until puberty is very labile (growth retardation and puberty, decreased metabolism and body temperature). In larger animals, such as rabbits, dogs and monkeys, the effect is less pronounced. The impact of fasting on human life expectancy still remains a question where not everything is clear and is unambiguous.
- 1936 The first European (and Western) journal about aging and longevity. It was published in Kishinev by Dimu Kotsovsky. During the first year of existence it was called Monatsberichte, then got the name German: Altersprobleme: Zeitschrift für Internationale Altersforschung und Altersbekämpfung = "Problems of Aging: Journal for the International Study and Combat of Aging". The journal published materials mostly in the German language, less in French and English.
- 1937 A Ukrainian Soviet pathophysiologist Alexander Bogomolets created antireticular cytotoxic serum in the hope to extend life of people to 150 years. Although the drug did not achieve its main goal, it has become widely used for the treatment of a number of diseases, especially infectious diseases and fractures. The serum of Bogomolets was actively used in Soviet hospitals during WWII. For his work, Alexander Bogomolets received in 1941 the Stalin Prize, which for Soviet scientists of those years was even more important than the Nobel Prize.
- 1938 The first specialized society dedicated to the study of aging. It was formed in Germany, Leipzig and was named the German Society for Aging Research (German: Deutsche Gesellschaft für Altersforschung, soon renamed to Deutsche Gesellschaft für Alternsforschung). The founder is Max Bürger. He also established the specialized journal Zeitschrift für Altersforschung – it is already the third such journal in the world after the previously mentioned Japanese and Romanian journals.
- 1938 The world's first scientific conference on aging and longevity in 1938 in Kiev, that was convened by Alexander Bogomolets.
- 1939 In the United Kingdom, the British Society for Research on Ageing is formed. The founder is Vladimir Korenchevsky who emigrated there from the former Russian Empire.

=== After WWII ===
After World War II, research tools and technologies of another level appeared. Thanks to these technologies, it became understandable what really occurs inside cells and between them (for example, the model of the DNA double helix was created in 1953). At the same time, changed ethical norms did not allow cardinal experiments to be performed on humans, as had been possible in previous decades. Consequently, the influence of different factors could be estimated only indirectly.

- 1945 In the US, the Gerontological Society of America is formed. The founder is Edmund Vincent Cowdry.
- 1950 Largely thanks to the collaborative efforts of Korenchevsky and Cowdry, the International Association of Gerontology is formed, later renamed to the International Association of Gerontology and Geriatrics (IAGG). The organization was registered in Belgium, and that is where its first conference took place. Slowly, gradually, the ideas began to spread that the problems of aging cannot be solved within the framework and efforts of one nation – therefore the international interaction is necessary.
- 1952 Peter Medawar proposed the mutation accumulation theory to explain how the aging process could have evolved.
- 1954 Vladimir Dilman formulated the hypothesis of aging that at first become known only in the USSR, as the elevation hypothesis. In 1968 it took the form and became known as the neuroendocrine theory of aging.
- 1956 Denham Harman proposed the free-radical theory of aging and demonstrated that free radical reactions contribute to the degradation of biological systems. The theory is based on the ideas of Rebeca Gerschman and her colleagues put forward in 1945.
- 1957 George Williams proposed the antagonistic pleiotropy hypothesis for the explanation of the emergence of aging.
- 1958 Physicist Gioacchino Failla proposed the hypothesis that aging is caused by the accumulation of DNA damage. The next year the hypothesis was developed by the physicist Leo Szilard, resulting in a number of related theories under the general name DNA damage theory of aging.
- 1961 Discovery by Leonard Hayflick of the limit of divisions for somatic cells, named the Hayflick limit. Hayflick found that normal human cells, extracted from fetus, are able to divide only about 50 times, after that they enter a senescence phase.
- 1969 Immunological theory of aging proposed by Roy Walford.
- 1974 Formation of the National Institute on Aging (NIA) – the aging of the population began to be perceived as a problem deserving state attention (and not as a problem of separate scientific societies). Since 1984, the NIA has begun to contribute in every way to the work of the National Archive of Computerized Data on Aging (NACDA).
- 1977 To explain aging, Thomas Kirkwood proposed the disposable soma theory. According to the theory, the organism has only a limited amount of resources that it has to allocate between different purposes (such as growth, reproduction, repair of damage). Aging occurs due to the limitation of resources that the body can afford to spend on repair.
- 1985 The discovery of telomerase, a ribonucleoprotein that is able to restore shortened telomeres. The discovery was made by Elizabeth Blackburn and Carol Greider. This research is based on the theoretical works of Alexey Olovnikov. The study of telomeres and telomerase required many more years and the work of many scientists around the world. For this work, in 2009, Elizabeth Blackburn, Carol Greider and Jack Szostak received the Nobel prize, in the same year Alexey Olovnikov was awarded the Demidov Prize.
- 1986 Reliability theory of aging and longevity proposed by Leonid Gavrilov and Natalia Gavrilova. At first it was published only in the USSR. In English language the theory was published five years later, in 1991.
- 1990 Formation of the Gerontology Research Group (GRG) which searches for supercentenarians around the world and verifies their age. Whenever possible, the organization tries to collect data on why these people live significantly longer than the average person. The organization regularly publishes a list of the oldest verified living supercentenarians.
- 1992 National Archive of Computerized Data on Aging (NACDA) published in the Internet the first 28 datasets related to aging. Gradually the number of published datasets has grown to over 1600 and continues to grow. These datasets are available to any researcher around the world at no charge, so they can search in them for new patterns. The site also provides some tools to facilitate analysis.
- 1993 Cynthia Kenyon and Ramon Tabtiang doubled the lifespan of C. elegans nematodes by partially disabling a gene, with the nematodes remaining relatively healthy for significantly longer. The discovery was a revolutionary breakthrough in aging research, demonstrating that the aging process could be controlled in the laboratory, and sparked more research into the molecular biology of aging.
- 1995 Method for detection of senescent cells using a cytochemical assay.
- 1997 The absolute record for the duration of human life. The French woman Jeanne Calment lived 122 years and 164 days (the record is still held).
- 1998 A record for the duration of life among males. The Danish-American Christian Mortensen lived 115 years and 252 days.
- 1998 Scientists managed to extend, in a laboratory environment, the life of normal human cells beyond the Hayflick limit using telomerase.
- 1999 Establishment of the Buck Institute for Research on Aging – the first institute originally established primarily to study intervention into the aging process.
- 1999 Sierra Sciences, a biotechnology company focused on aging research with the goal of curing human aging, was founded by William H. Andrews.

=== 21st century ===
The research activity has increased. There is a shift of focus of the scientific community from the passive study of aging and theorizing to research aimed at intervening in the aging process to extend the lives of organisms beyond their genetic limits. Scientific-commercial companies appear, which aim to create practical technologies for measuring the biological age of a person (in contrast to chronological age) and extend the life of people to a greater extend than the healthy lifestyle and preventive medicine can provide. In society and media there are discussions not only about whether a significant prolongation of life is physically possible, but also whether it is appropriate, about the possibility of officially classifying aging as a disease, and about the possibility of mass testing on human volunteers.

- 2003 First evidence that aging of nematodes is regulated via TOR signaling.
- 2003 The Methuselah Foundation is organized by Aubrey de Grey and David Gobel to create life extension technologies based on the Strategies for engineered negligible senescence (SENS) approaches and supporting related research in other organizations.
- 2003 Andrzej Bartke created a mouse that lived 1,819 days (8 days short of 5 years), while the maximum lifespan for this species is 1,030–1,070 days. By human standards, such longevity is equivalent to about 180 years.
- 2004 First evidence that aging of nematodes is regulated by AMP-Kinase.
- 2004 Aubrey de Grey coined the term "longevity escape velocity" (LEV). Though the concept per se has been present in the life extension community since at least the 1970s (for example, Robert Wilson, essay Next Stop, Immortality, 1978).
- 2004 As a result of the use of anti-aging therapy, a team of scientists led by Stephen Spindler managed to extend the life of a group of already adult mice to an average of 3.5 years. For this achievement, the first Methuselah Mouse Rejuvenation 'M Prize' was awarded.
- 2004 Creation of the first curated database of genes related to human ageing: GenAge.
- 2006 Creation of induced stem cells (iSC) from somatic cells by the simultaneous action of several factors. First produced by the Japanese scientist Shinya Yamanaka. In 2012, Shinya Yamanaka and John Gurdon received the Nobel Prize for their work on reprogramming mature cells into pluripotent cells.
- 2007 Extension of mouse lifespan via deletion of insulin receptor in the brain.
- 2007 The book Ending Aging written by Aubrey de Grey and his research assistant Michael Rae.
- 2007 First evidence that a pharmacological agent (namely, metformin) at a certain dosage is capable to increase the lifespan of mice.
- 2008 Foundation of the Max Planck Institute for Biology of Ageing.
- 2008 (approximately) It was observed that different variants of FOXO3 gene are associated with human longevity. Since then, research has been conducted to better understand its functions and the mechanism of action.
- 2009 Association of genetic variants in insulin/IGF1 signaling with human longevity.
- 2009 A second pharmacological agent (namely, rapamycin) was shown to be capable to increase the lifespan of mice. For this discovery Dave Sharp receive a special prize from the Methuselah Foundation.
- 2009 The SENS Research Foundation, a research institute dedicated to studying the aging process and ways to reverse it based on the strategies for engineered negligible senescence approach, was established by Aubrey de Grey.
- 2010s first half The appearance of small political parties in different countries that make the promotion of anti-aging technologies part of their political platforms (for example, Science Party of Australia, U.S. Transhumanist Party, Party for Rejuvenation Research).
- 2010 Harvard University scientists at the Dana–Farber Cancer Institute partially reversed age-related degeneration in mice by engineering an improved telomerase gene.
- 2012 It was discovered that protein Sirtuin 6 (SIRT6) regulates the lifespan of male mice (but not female mice).
- 2013 The pan-tissue Epigenetic clock is a molecular biomarker by Steve Horvath that facilitates the measurement of the age of all human tissues based on cytosine methylation.
- 2013 The scientific journal Cell published the article "The Hallmarks of Aging", that was translated to several languages and determined the directions of many studies.
- 2013 A record for the duration of life among males. Japanese Jiroemon Kimura lived 116 years and 54 days (that is 167 days longer than the previous record).
- 2013 It was discovered that brain-specific overexpression of Sirtuin 1 (SIRT1) is also capable to extend lifespan and delay aging in mice.
- 2013 Google and other investors created the company Calico to combat aging and related diseases. Investors provided Calico with more than a billion dollars of funding. Arthur Levinson became CEO of the company and one of its investors.
- 2014 First evidence that pharmacological activation of SIRT1 extends lifespan in mice and improves their health.
- 2014 Establishment of the Dog Aging Project at the University of Washington, a decade-long study of aging in dogs which includes clinical trials of rapamycin in some of them to test its effects on lifespan, with the project's ultimate goal being to translate the results into further understanding aging in humans and ways to target it.
- 2010s second half The emergence of official discussions about the possibility of recognizing aging as a disease.
- 2016 It was found that the replenishment of NAD^{+} in the organism of mice through precursor molecules improves the functioning of mitochondria and stem cells, and also leads to an increase in their lifespan. One of these NAD^{+} precursor molecules is NMN.
- 2016 Demonstration that a combination of longevity associated drugs can additively extend lifespan, at least in mice.
- 2016 As part of the implementation of the SENS programs, researchers managed to make two mitochondrial genes, ATP8 and ATP6, stably express from the cell nucleus in the cell culture.
- 2016 Scientists show that expressing Yamanaka reprogramming factors in mice with premature aging can extend their lifespan by about 20%.
- 2017 The discovery that a naturally occurring polymorphism in human signaling pathways is in some cases associated with health and longevity. It was also detected that, the same as in mice, this association can depend on the sex (it can be observed for one sex but not for another). This indicates that by correctly influencing these pathways, it is theoretically possible to alter lifespan and healthspan in humans.
- 2017 AgeX Therapeutics, a biotechnology company focused on medical therapeutics related to longevity, was founded.
- 2018 The Nobel Prize for cancer research was awarded to James Allison and Tasuku Honjo. (The main cause of cancer is the accumulation of errors in DNA. So the topic of cancer research is closely related to research on aging.)
- 2018 The World Health Organization included in the international classification of diseases ICD-11 a special additional code XT9T, signaling the relationship of a disease with age. Due to this, after the final approval of the ICD-11 in May 2019, aging began to be officially recognized as a fundamental factor that increases the risk of diseases, the severity of their course and the difficulty of treatment.
- 2018 Scientists show that reprogramming human skin fibroblast cells with Yamanaka factors reversed epigenetic age for 30 years within the first two weeks of reprogramming, while retaining the original cellular identity, pinpointing partial (interrupted) cellular reprogramming as a viable method for age reversal, i.e. rejuvenation.

==== 2019 ====
- The lifespan of Caenorhabditis elegans (free-living nematodes) was increased by 5–6 times (by 400–500%) using simultaneous impact in IIS and TOR pathways. This is equivalent to how a human would live 400–500 years. The study was done by the MDI Biological Laboratory in collaboration with the Buck Institute for Research on Aging and Nanjing University.
- Scientists at the Mayo Clinic report the first successful use of senolytics, a new class of drug with potential anti-aging benefits, to remove senescent cells from human patients with a kidney disease.
- By combining doses of lithium, trametinib and rapamycin into a single treatment, researchers extend the lifespan of fruit flies (Drosophila) by 48%.
- Researchers at Harvard Medical School identify a link between neural activity and human longevity. Neural excitation is linked to shorter life, while suppression of overactivity appears to extend lifespan.
- Scientists at the Riken Center for Integrative Medical Sciences and Keio University use single-cell RNA analysis to find that supercentenarians have an excess of cytotoxic CD4 T-cells, a type of immune cell. This phenomenon was first demonstrated in mice

==== 2020 ====
- Scientists report, using public biological data on 1.75 m people with known lifespans overall, to have identified 10 genomic loci which appear to intrinsically influence healthspan, lifespan, and longevity – of which half have not been reported previously at genome-wide significance and most being associated with cardiovascular disease – as well as haem metabolism as a promising candidate for further research within the field.
- Scientists report that after mice exercise their livers secrete the protein GPLD1, which is also elevated in elderly humans who exercise regularly, that this is associated with improved cognitive function in aged mice and that increasing the amount of GPLD1 produced by the mouse liver in old mice could yield many benefits of regular exercise for their brains – such as increased BDNF-levels, neurogenesis, and improved cognitive functioning in tests.
- Scientists report that yeast cells of the same genetic material and within the same environment age in two distinct ways, describe a biomolecular mechanism that can determine which process dominates during aging and genetically engineer a novel aging route with substantially extended lifespan.
- Reprogramming progress
  - Scientists show that expression of nuclear reprogramming factors can lead to rapid and broad amelioration of cellular aging.
  - A study shows that reprogramming induced with the OSK-genes can restore youthful epigenetic patterns as well as revert age-related vision loss.

==== 2021 ====
- Researchers report that myeloid cells are drivers of a maladaptive inflammation element of brain-ageing in mice and that this can be reversed or prevented via inhibition of their EP2 signalling.
- A randomized clinical trial demonstrates that a combination therapy of a short (two months) intervention of diet, phytonutrient and probiotics supplementation, exercise, relaxation and further lifestyle changes can lead to substantial decrease of the Horvath DNAmAge Epigenetic clock epigenetic aging biomarker in healthy adults and that such may therefore be, measurable, DNA methylome rejuvenation guidance.
- Scientists report alternative approach to senolytics for removing senescent cells: invariant NKT (iNKT) cells.
- Scientists demonstrate a tool to calculate a person's inflammatory age (iAge) based on patterns of systemic age-related inflammation and identify cytokine CXCL9 as a key suppression target.
- A study indicates gut microbiomes with large amounts of microbes capable of generating unique secondary bile acids are a key element of centenarians' longevity.
- Scientists identify genetic determinants of ovarian ageing and possible effects of extending fertility in women.
- Scientists show that transplantation of fecal microbiota from young donor mice into aged recipient mice substantially rejuvenates the brains of the latter, complementing similar results of a 2020 study.

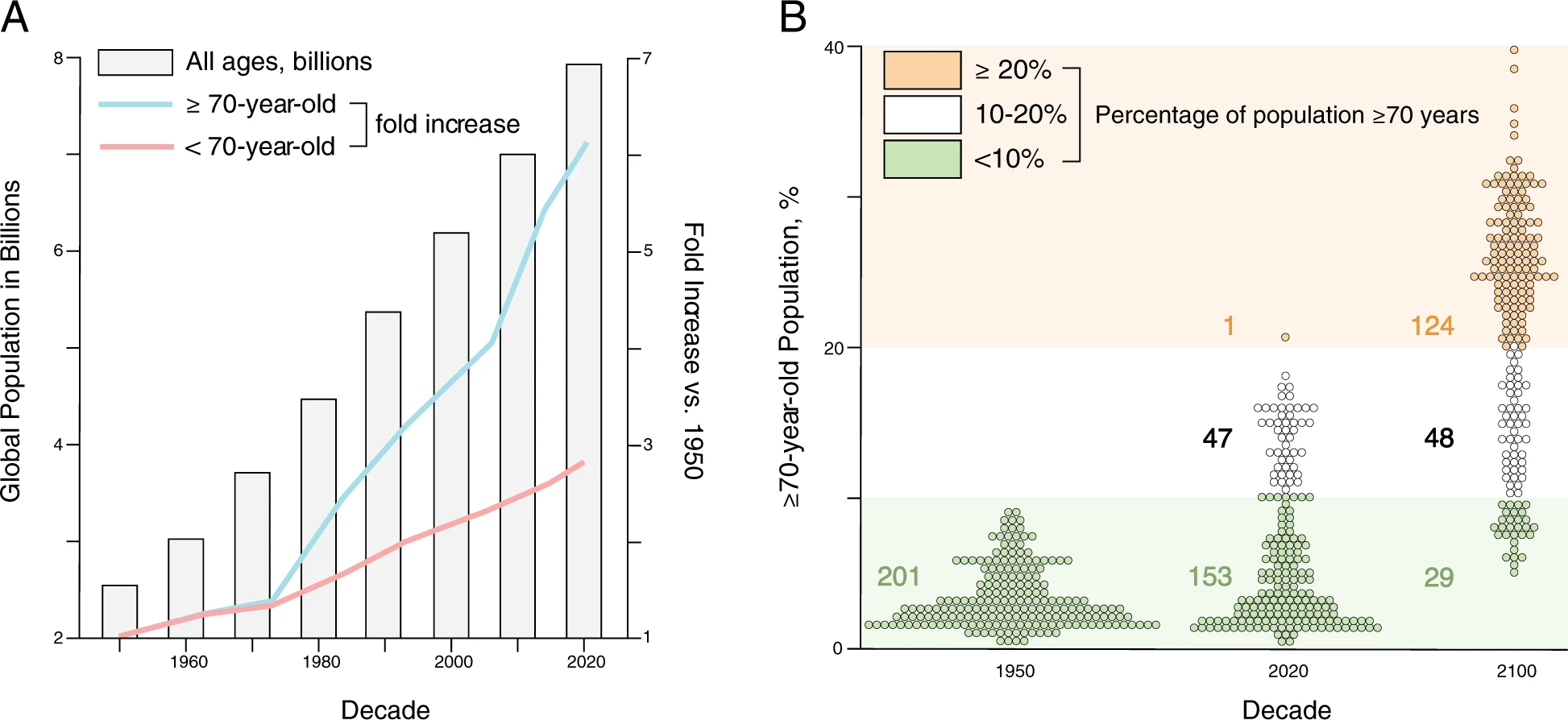
Past and projected age of the human world population through time as of 2021

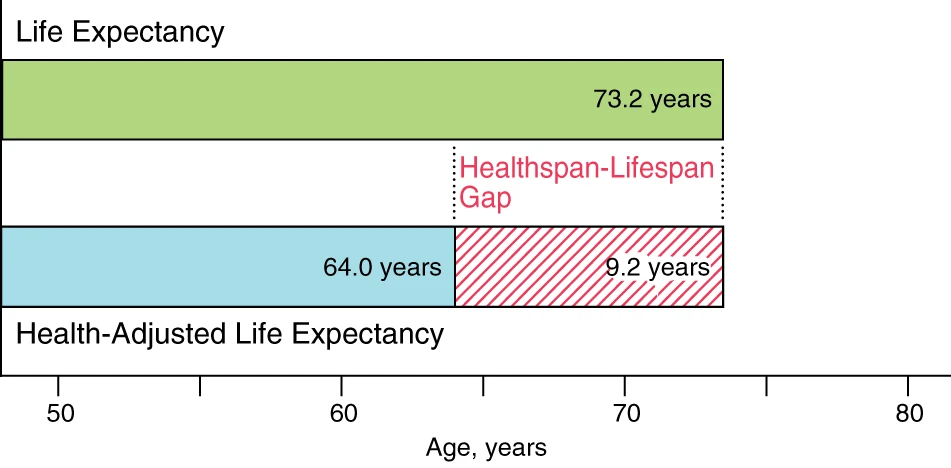
Healthspan-lifespan gap (LHG)

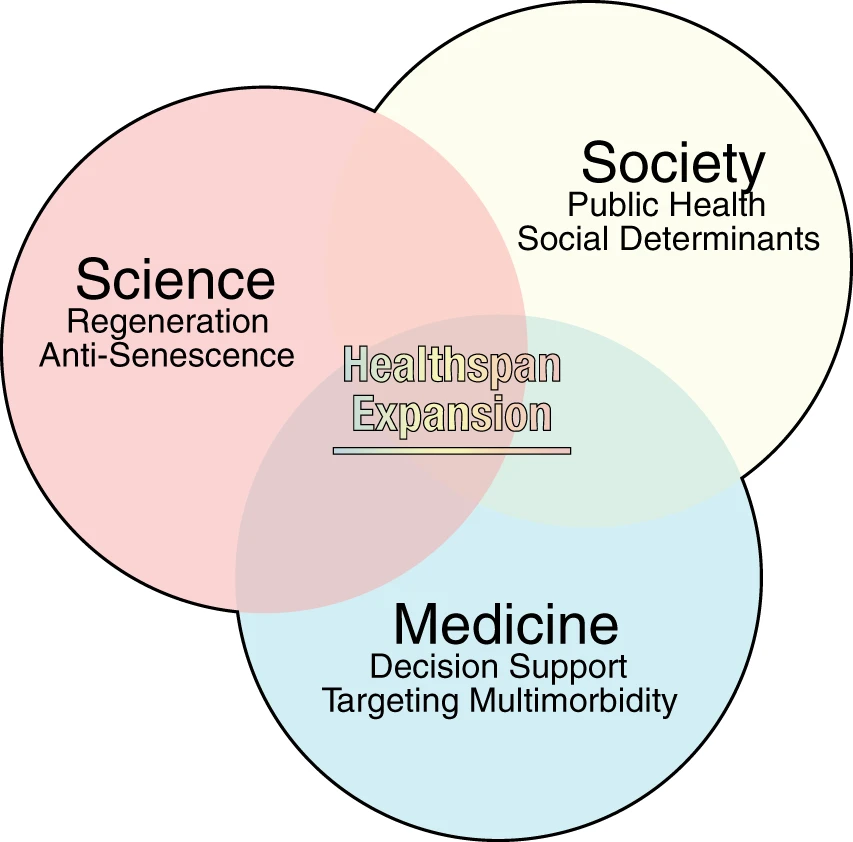
Healthspan extension relies on the unison of social, clinical and scientific programs or domains of work.

- A study highlight the importance of extending healthspans, not just lifespans and especially as life expectancy rises and demographics shift. Biological aging or the healthspan-lifespan gap (LHG) comes with a great cost burden to society, including potentially rising health care costs (also depending on types and costs of treatments). Scientists have noted that "[c]hronic diseases of aging are increasing and are inflicting untold costs on human quality of life". Further reasons to prioritize healthspans as much as lifespans include global quality of life or wellbeing.
- A scientific review concludes that accumulating data suggests dietary restriction (DR) – mainly intermittent fasting and caloric restriction – results in many of the same beneficial changes in adult humans as in studied organisms, potentially increasing health- and lifespan. A review published a few days later provides an overview of DR as an intervention and develops a framework for a proposed field of "precision nutrigeroscience". A study published a few days later identifies circadian-regulated autophagy as a critical contributor to intermittent time-restricted fasting-mediated lifespan extension in Drosophila and suggests that only certain forms of and/or combinations with intermittent fasting – intervals during which no food but only e.g. water and tea/coffee are ingested – may be effective beyond the benefits of healthy body weight.
- Scientists show that and how the flavonoid Procyanidin C1 of the antioxidant grape seed extract increases the health- and lifespan of mice.
- A vaccine to remove senescent cells, a key driver of the aging process, is demonstrated in mice by researchers from Japan.
- The American biotechnology company Altos Labs, which focuses on life extension research, is founded.

==== 2022 ====
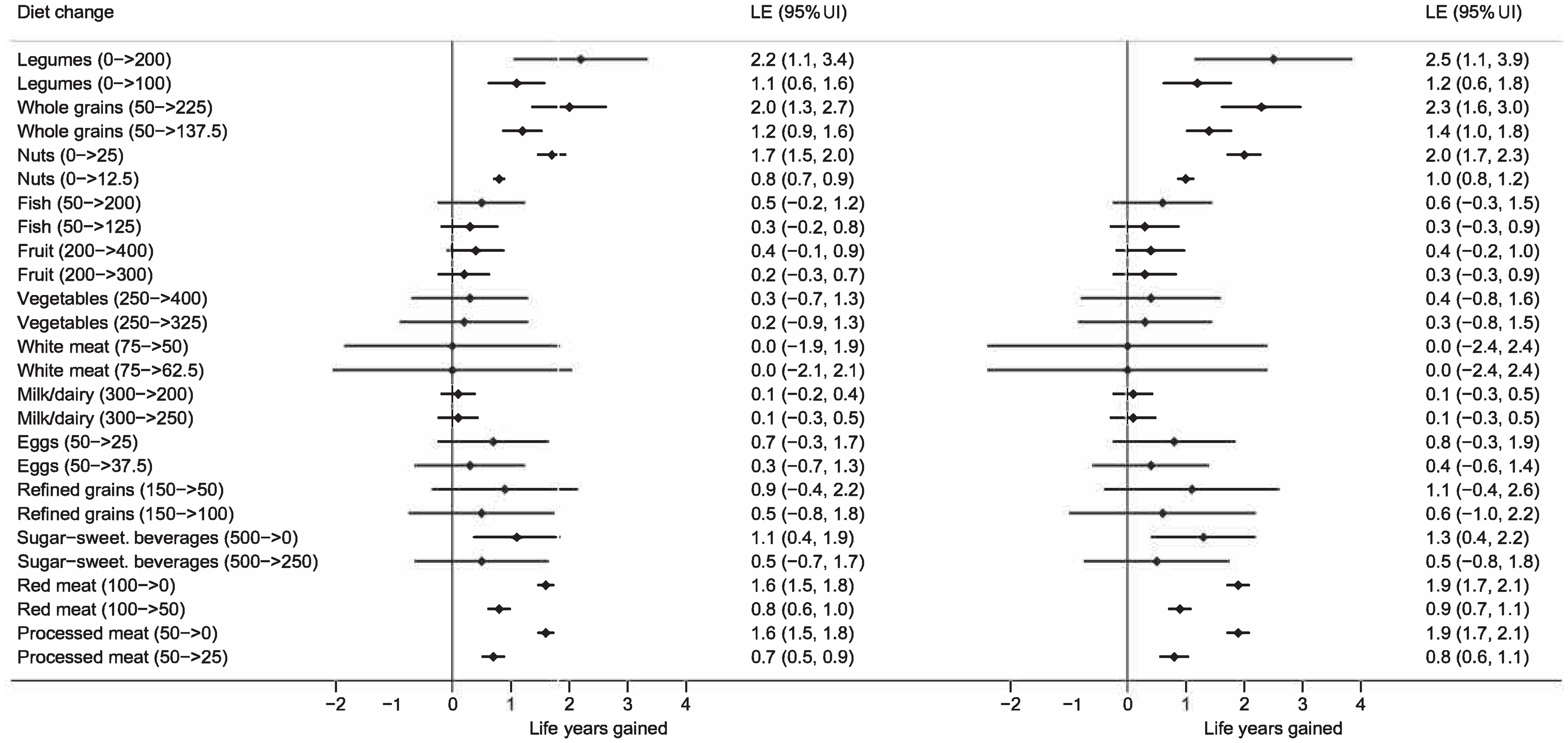
Expected life years gained for 20-year-olds in the U.S. who change from a typical Western diet to an, according to an integrative study, "optimized diet" (changes indicated on the left in gram)

- Nutrition-related results
  - A study by researchers from the University of Bergen and Haukeland University Hospital integrates meta-analyses and data in a tool that shows populations' relative general life extension potentials of different food groups according to this available data, mostly consisting of observational studies.
  - Results from the first controlled trial of caloric restriction in healthy non-obese humans, CALERIE, are published, confirming benefits and identifying a key protein that could be harnessed to extend health in humans, PLA2G7.
  - A comprehensive review reaffirms likely beneficial health effects with links to health/life extension of cycles of caloric restriction and intermittent fasting as well as reducing meat consumption in humans. It identifies issues with contemporary nutrition research approaches, proposing a multi-pillar approach, and summarizes findings towards constructing – multi-system-considering and at least age-personalized dynamic – refined longevity diets and proposes inclusion of such in standard preventive healthcare.
  - A study demonstrates that a 30% caloric restriction extended life spans of male C57BL/6J mice by 10% but when combined with daily intermittent fasting and eating during the most active time of the day it extended life span by 35%.
  - A study shows that 50+ aged users of the dietary program SNAP "had about 2 fewer years of cognitive aging over a 10-year period compared with non-users" despite it having nearly no conditions for the sustainability and healthiness of the food products purchased with the coupons (or coupon-credits).
  - A cohort study indicates dietary intakes of total flavonols – and at least kaempferol- and quercetin-containing foods in specific – may substantially decrease decline in multiple cognitive abilities with older age, showing a difference of "0.4 units per decade" between 5 mg and 15 mg intakes.
  - A paywalled study reports higher percentage of daily energy consumption of ultra-processed foods, such as white bread or instant noodles, was associated with faster cognitive decline in aging. Differences can be as large or larger than a 28% faster rate of global cognitive decline.
- Pharmaceutical/supplemental intervention-related results
  - Researchers report that the widely used supplements glycine and NAC when combined as "GlyNAC", which previously showed various beneficial effects in humans i.a. in a small trial by the authors, can extend lifespan by 24% in mice when taken at old age.
  - Biomedical gerontologists demonstrate a mechanism of anti-aging senolytics, in particular of Dasatinib plus Quercetin (D+Q) – an increase of α-Klotho as shown in mice, human cells and in a human trial.
  - A study reports that in model animals, treatment with rapamycin – which typically has negative side-effects – for a limited timespan extended lifespan as much as life-long administration started at the same age and that it was most effective during early adulthood.

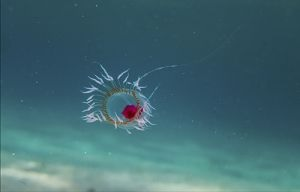
T. dohrnii

- Biological and biotechnical rejuvenation-related results
  - A new cellular rejuvenation therapy of bursts of iPSC reprogramming is reported, which can reverse aspects of aging in mice, without causing cancer or other health problems.
  - Bioresearchers demonstrate an in vitro method (MPTR) for rejuvenation (including the transcriptome and epigenome) reprogramming, working better than previous reprogramming methods, in which fibroblast skin cells temporarily lose their cell identity.
  - Scientists report the key molecular mechanisms of rejuvenation they found in a comparison of the newly presented genomes of the biologically immortal T. dohrnii and a similar but non-rejuvenating jellyfish, involving e.g. DNA replication and repair, and stem cell renewal.
  - A first spatiotemporal map reveals key insights about axolotl brain regeneration. Axolotls retain regenerative capacity in their aging throughout their lives. It is thought that by "understanding the mechanisms of regeneration, we eventually will be able to enhance our intrinsic regenerative abilities in order to slow and even reverse the damage of aging."
  - Scientists report leprosy-causing bacteria viably regenerate and rejuvenate the liver in its armadillos hosts, which may enable novel human therapies.
- A study shows that infusing the nourishing cerebrospinal fluid from around brain cells of young mice into aged brains rejuvenates aspects of the brain, identifying FGF17 as a key target for potential therapeutics such as of anti-aging.
- A study shows the clonal diversity of stem cells that produce blood cells gets drastically reduced around age 70 to a faster-growing few, substantiating a novel theory of ageing which could enable healthy aging.
- A study shows that blood cells' loss of the Y chromosome in a subset of cells with age, reportedly affecting at least 40% of 70 years-old men to some degree, contributes to fibrosis, heart risks, and mortality in a causal way.
- Researchers describe a way by which the aging of select immune system T cells can be prevented or is slowed down, with relevance to life extension and making vaccines more durable.
- The discovery of "super neurons" in the entorhinal cortex of people over age 80 who show exceptional episodic memory is reported.
- Scientists report that some apparently senescent cells – which are targeted by anti-aging senolytics – are required for regeneration, and suggest tailoring senolytics to precisely target harmful senescent cells while leaving the ones involved in regeneration intact.
- A study indicates that aging shifts activity toward short genes or shorter transcript length and that this can be countered by interventions.
- Scientists report that sphingolipids accumulate in muscle during aging whose genetic inhibition or ceramide-blockers such as myriocin could counteract, reducing associated muscle loss.
- By stimulating (or charging) genetically engineered roundworm mitochondria with light, researchers show that halting the decline in mitochondrial membrane potential can slow aging.
- It was proposed to expand the list of the nine hallmarks of aging with five more.
- Saudi Arabia has started a not-for-profit organization called "the Hevolution Foundation" with budget $1 billion per year for developing anti-aging technology.

==== 2023 ====
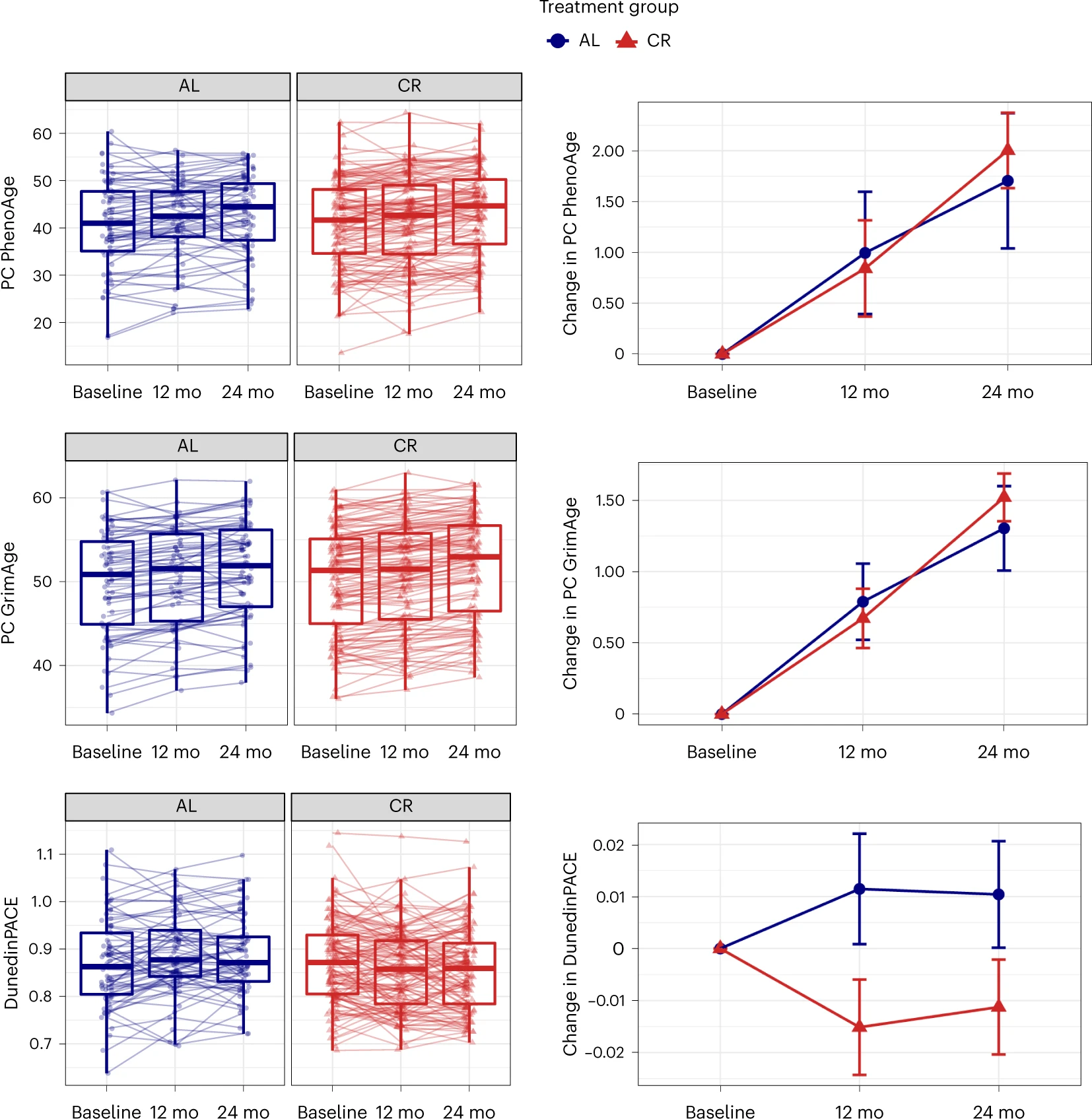
Results of the first longevity caloric restriction (CR) trial, CALERIE

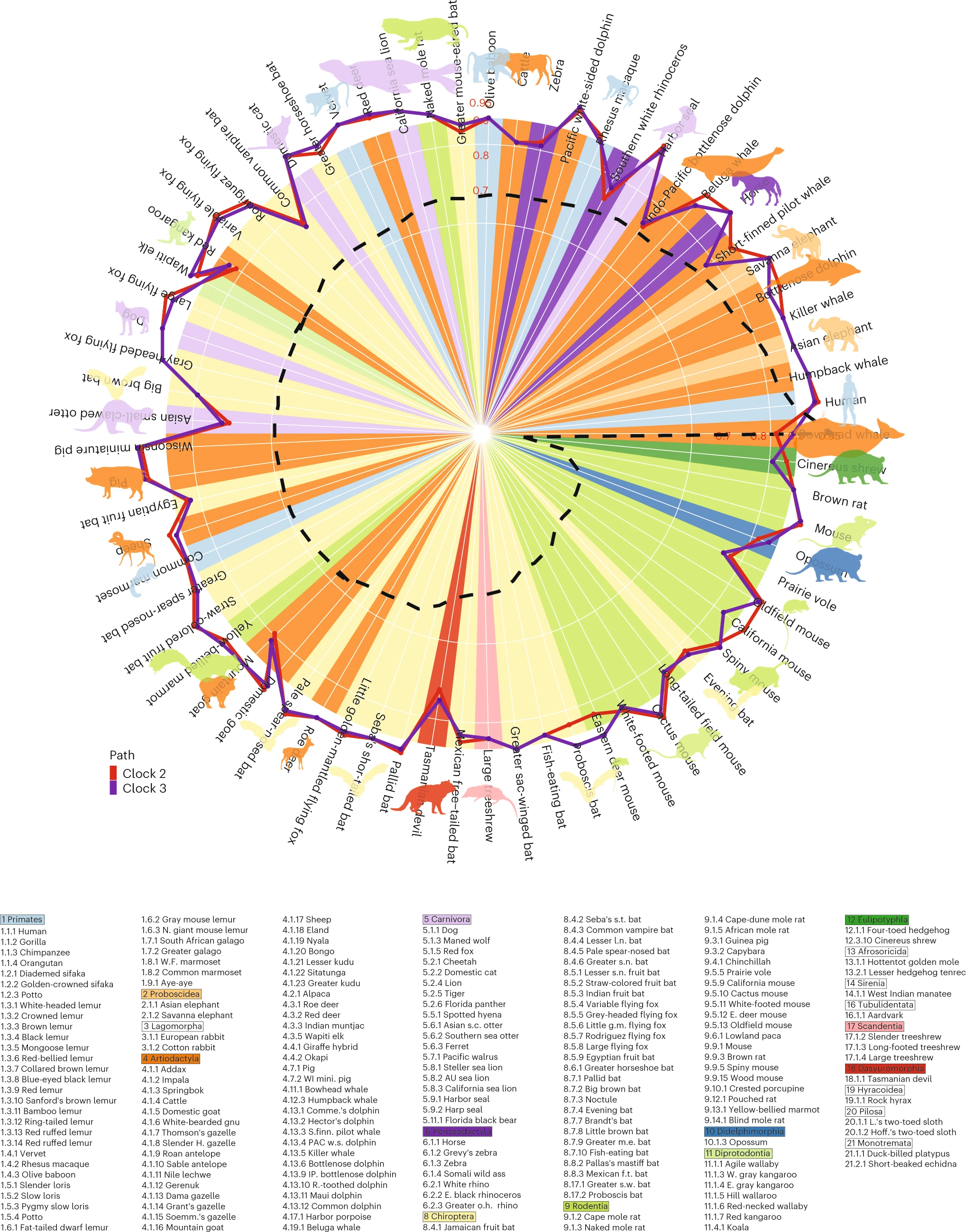
A global consortium identifies changes in methylation levels that occur with age across mammals.

- Nutrition-related results
  - A study reports results of the first longevity caloric restriction (CR) trial, CALERIE, finding that two years of nonintermittent CR slowed the pace of aging as measured by one of three aging clocks (modest DunedinPACE effects).
- Development and application of aging clocks and combination therapies
  - A study reports the development of deep learning software using anatomic magnetic resonance images to estimate brain age with the highest accuracy for AI so far, including detecting early signs of Alzheimer's disease and varying neuroanatomical patterns of neurological aging.
  - A study shows DNA methylation aging clocks could be useful indicators of health while social factors – such as health behaviors and poverty – are at least as good predictors and e.g. can better predict cognitive functioning. Around February, Bryan Johnson's Project Blueprint for one of the first comprehensive, possibly largely public, self-experimentations of a comprehensive combination therapy informed by the large scientific corpus on the topic and organ measurements to maximally reverse biological age and (epigenetic) aging markers achieves substantial media attention, with such activities previously largely reserved to biohackers without resources and means to evaluate effects.
  - The pan-mammalian epigenetic clock is a molecular biomarker designed to measure the age of all mammalian tissues and species using cytosine methylation in highly conserved DNA regions.
  - A study indicates chest radiographs evaluated using AI could be a performant biomarker for aging clocks.
  - A study using plasma proteomics aging clocks suggests nearly 20% of the population may show strongly accelerated age in one of 11 major organs, which it links to higher mortality risk.
- Biological and biotechnical rejuvenation-related results
  - In January, a team led by David Sinclair shows in a 13-year-long international study how DNA breaks or epigenetic damage are a major driver of epigenetic change, and how the loss of epigenetic information is a cause of aging in mammals. It concluded that the loss of epigenetic information can drive aging independently of changes to the genetic code, suggesting that epigenetic change is a primary driver of aging in mammals. Using a treatment based on Yamanaka factors, they demonstrate an ability to drive aging in both the forward and reverse directions in mice.
  - In a preprint, another team of researchers of the biotechnology company Rejuvenate Bio also reports the use of Yamanaka-reprogramming to modestly extend the lives of elderly mice. However, if it was also applicable to humans, risks may include the formation of cancer.
  - In July, the David Sinclair team at Harvard Medical School release a study that claims to have discovered the first known chemical approach to reprogram cells to a younger state by delivering the Yamanaka factors directly, whereas previously this had only been achievable via gene therapy.
  - A study indicates factors contributing to the longevity of long-living organisms can be transferred between species, particularly from naked mole-rats to mice.
- Chemical intervention-related results
  - First senolytics discovered using artificial intelligence: Teams from the University of Edinburgh and the Massachusetts Institute of Technology independently report the discovery of senolytics using artificial intelligence for screening large chemical libraries. The works reported compounds of comparable efficacy and increased potency than other known senolytics.
  - A study identifies low levels of taurine, which declines with age, as a driver of the aging process and suggests that taurine supplements may increase lifespan.
  - Ora Biomedical announces the "million molecule challenge", an effort to assess 1 million potential longevity interventions within five years using artificial intelligence.
  - A study suggests chemical alternatives to age reversal via Yamanaka factors gene therapy are feasible via early in vitro fibroblasts data. These results have not yet been validated in an animal and via more reliable "improvements in age-related health metrics or lifespan".
  - Subcutaneous administration of longevity factor α-klotho enhanced cognition in old rhesus macaques.
- In a paywalled review, the authors of a heavily cited paper on the hallmarks of aging update the set of proposed hallmarks after a decade. A review with overlapping authors merge or link various hallmarks of cancer with those of aging.
- A study concludes that retroviruses in the human genomes can become awakened from dormant states and, in senescent cells and aged tissue, contribute to aging which can be blocked by neutralizing antibodies, resulting in improved function.
- A study by Columbia University researchers suggests hypermetabolism in cells due to impaired mitochondria is a driver of aging.
- A previously unknown cell mechanism involved in aging is discovered, which explains how cells 'remember' their identity when they divide – the cells' so-called epigenetic memory.
- A team of scientists from New York University identifies a potential cause of greying hair with age as the failure of melanocyte stem cells to mature with age. The study was carried out using mice, which have identical cells for their fur. According to the research team, the results could provide a basis for reversing the hair greying process.
- A study affirms and explains why a moderate decrease in body temperature extends lifespan.
- A study finds that human organs may age at different rates in some individuals, finding that nearly 20% of the 5,676 adults screened showed signs of accelerated aging in one organ and that 1.7% had more than one organ in a state of accelerated aging.
- By publishing virome-related results, researchers close a major gap in the acceleratingly accumulating research into centenarians' microbiome characteristics for life extension.
- Scientists at the University of Colorado report what they believe to be the primary mechanism behind cognitive decline in aging, the mis-regulation of the brain protein CaMKII.
- Three studies indicate platelets, including or especially FF4, are exerkines with health- and life-extension-potential that rejuvenate aging brains of mice.

==== 2024 ====
- Researchers demonstrated antibody-mediated depletion of myeloid-biased hematopoietic stem cells against immune system aging with mice.
- An experiment by researchers at Imperial College London, the MRC London Institute of Medical Sciences, and Duke–NUS Medical School found that reduction in levels of the protein interleukin 11, which increases in the body with age and in excess is responsible for increased inflammation, reversed some aspects of aging in mice. The experiment, which involved genetically engineering some mice to block the production of the protein and allowing others to reach middle age before giving them a drug to eliminate it from their bodies, increased their lifespans by 20–25% and reversed numerous effects of aging.
- Precious3GPT, an artificial intelligence model designed to assist in aging research and drug discovery, was launched.
- A study by scientists at Stanford University found that rather than being a solely gradual and linear process, aging accelerates dramatically at two points in a human lifetime. The study, which tracked thousands of different molecules in 108 people aged between 25 and 75, found that age-related changes rise substantially in two waves, with the first occurring at around age 44 and the second at around age 60.
- Researchers at the MD Anderson Cancer Center activated the telomerase reverse transcriptase gene, which declines with age, in mice and found that it both lengthened telomeres in cells and that signs of aging in cells that had not synthesized telomeres were also ameliorated suggesting that telomerase reverse transcriptase is responsible for regulating genes involved in aging independent of its role in building telomeres.
- Researchers at the Institute for Research in Biomedicine demonstrated that senescent cells release mt-dsRNA into the cytosol driving the SASP via RIGI/MDA5/MAVS/MFN1, and in turn are hypersensitive to mt-dsRNA-driven inflammation due to reduced levels of PNPT1/ADAR1. Moreover, senescent cells within fibrotic and aged tissues also present increased dsRNA foci, and inhibition of mitochondrial RNA polymerase reduces systemic inflammation associated to senescence.
- A study at Tufts Medical Center identified more than 300 unique metabolic markers associated with aging, extreme longevity, and mortality.
- Researchers at Stanford University reported reversing signs of Alzheimer's disease in the brains of mice by removing the enzyme IDO1, which changed the behavior of astrocytes, as IDO1 levels rise in the brain and astrocytes stop performing their function when Alzheimer's appears. The results were repeated with human astrocytes and neurons from Alzheimer's patients.
- Researchers with the biotechnology company Rejuvenate Bio managed to extend the lifespans of elderly mice by 109%, reverse age-related frailty in the mice, and achieve signs of age reversal in human skin cells with gene therapy, employing partial cellular reprogramming.

==== 2025 ====
- UPF1 was found to decline significantly during cellular senescence. The findings suggest that the fall in UPF1 accelerates senescence by slowing down nonsense-mediated mRNA decay. The study was conducted by scientists at Chungnam National University, the Korea Research Institute of Bioscience and Biotechnology, the Korea Advanced Institute of Science and Technology, and the US National Institute on Aging.
- Scientists at the University of California, Berkeley managed to extend the lifespans of elderly male mice by 73% with a 14% increase in overall lifespan with the Alk5 inhibitor OT+A5i.
- Researchers at RWTH Aachen University discovered that four senolytic compounds – JQ1, RG7112, nutlin-3a, and AMG232 – can decrease epigenetic age in in vitro blood samples.
- Researchers at the University of Osaka discovered that the protein AP2A1 may regulate cellular senescence, finding that suppressing the protein in older cells reversed senescence and promoted rejuvenation, whereas overexpression of the protein in young cells advanced senescence.
- A study by scientists at University College London, Stanford University, Inserm, and the University of Helsinki found that accelerated aging in specific organs could be predictors for diseases across the entire body, not just those affecting that particular organ.
- A study at the University of Texas at Austin identified the exposure of osteocytes to senescent cells as a key driver of aging in bones.
- Scientists at the Allen Institute reported that they identified specific cell types in the brains of mice that undergo changes with age and a specific area where many of the changes occur.
- Researchers at Korea University, Yonsei University, the University of California, Berkeley, and Tufts University found that the protein HMGB1 induces cellular senescence throughout the body and blocking it can inhibit senescence, reduce systemic inflammation, and improve muscle regeneration.
- An experiment at the Max Planck Institute for the Biology of Ageing in which mice were given Rapamycin and Trametinib found that lifespan and healthspan were significantly extended in both male and female mice.
- A study at the University of Haifa found that synchronization between organs declines with age except for the immune system, with inflammatory responses becoming more coordinated between different organs the older a person gets. The researchers mapped the biological systems and specific genes involved, suggesting that the discovery could improve diagnostics and with time pave the way to interventions into the process.
- Researchers at the University of California, San Francisco, reported that the protein FTL1 may be a major cause of brain aging, finding that blocking the protein in mice restored youthful brain function.
- A study led by Lige Leng of Xiamen University suggested that a drop in the brain protein MEN1 in the hypothalamus may be a driver of physiological aging, and that an amino acid supplement may counter some of the effects.
- Researchers at Bar-Ilan University in collaboration with the University of Haifa developed a computational tool that tracked post-translational modifications in long-lived mammals which allow them to resist age-related diseases.
- Scientists at the Chinese Academy of Sciences and Capital Medical University reversed key signs of aging in monkeys using genetically engineered human stem cells.
- Researchers at Tongji University reported that they discovered a DNA repair mechanism in naked mole rats which enables them to live an unusually long lifespan for creatures of their size and makes them resistant to cancer, brain and spinal cord deterioration, and arthritis.
- Scientists at the University of Illinois Chicago reported that a decline in platelet factor 4 with age drives mutations in hematopoietic stem cells which can lead to inflammation and increased risk of blood cancer and cardiovascular disease. Adding platelet factor 4 to old blood cells was found to reverse signs of aging as a result of this decline.
- Scientists at the Icahn School of Medicine at Mount Sinai found that reactivating lysosomes, which decline with age, caused cells to regain youthful function.
- A study at Ben-Gurion University of the Negev found that T helper cells can destroy senescent cells.
- Researchers at MIT and the Broad Institute found that reprogramming cells in the livers of mice can reverse age-related decline in T cell numbers, which is a component of age-related decline in the function of the immune system.

==== 2026 ====
- Scientists at the University of New Mexico reported that the enzyme OTULIN, known for regulating immune activity, plays a major role in producing Tau proteins, which are associated with neurodegenerative disorders including Alzheimer's disease, brain inflammation, and aging. The research team found that disabling OTULIN stopped Tau production and removed existing Tau from neurons.
- A study at the Weizmann Institute of Science suggested that genetics play a larger role in determining human lifespan than previously believed, estimating that longevity is 50% heritable, about double what previous studies had concluded and matching the findings of lifespan studies in animals.
- A research team led by Johannes Gräff at EPFL found that partial reprogramming of engram neurons reversed cognitive decline in aged mice as well as mice with Alzheimer's.
- Scientists at the University of Rochester successfully transferred a longevity-related gene from naked mole rats to mice, which made the mice healthier and extended their lifespans.
- A study at the University of Sydney reported that a four-week diet change in older adults, with reduced fat intake or shift to plant-based protein, improved key health biomarkers tied to aging, with a low-fat and high-carb diet giving the strongest results.
- A study at the University of Texas Medical Branch found that transplanting a youthful gut microbiome into aging mice reversed aging in the liver and prevented liver cancer.
- A study at Duke University found that decline in muscle strength as part of the aging process can be attributed to a decline in glutaminase, and that restoring it in the muscles of aged mice improved muscle function.
- A study at the University of California, San Francisco identified the accumulation of the protein FTL1 as the main driver of brain aging. An experiment found that removing it from the brains of elderly mice reversed age-related decline while introducing it into the brains of young mice immediately aged their brains.
- Researchers Tel Aviv University, Bar-Ilan University, and the National Institute on Aging reported reversing key signs of age-related decline in the livers of aged mice by boosting levels of Sirtuin 6.
- Researchers at Texas A&M University reported reversing signs of brain aging by using extracellular vesicles loaded with microRNAs to reduce inflammation by means of a nasal spray to bypass the blood–brain barrier.
- Two studies at Mass General Brigham found that the health of the thymus in adulthood is one of the strongest predictors of longevity, cardiovascular health, and cancer survival including response to immunotherapy in adulthood.
- Scientists at the Leibniz Institute on Aging identified declining levels of phosphatidylcholine as a driver of age-related mitochondrial dysfunction and loss of cellular energy. They found that boosting phosphatidylcholine resulted in more youthful mitochondrial performance in aging organisms.
- A study at Duke–NUS Medical School found that healthy muscle releases molecular signals into the bloodstream protecting against tumor growth throughout the body, that the amount of such signals declines with age, and that exercise can restore and protect the ability of aging muscles to send these signals.

- First reverse aging trial in humans

° The biopharmeceutical company Life Biosciences, founded by David A. Sinclair, announced the start of a phase 1 clinical trial for ER-100, a novel therapy intended to reverse age-related vision loss via the activation of three genes in retinal ganglion cells, marking the first time a cellular reprogramming therapy was given to humans.

== See also ==
- Longevity escape velocity
- Life extension
- Rejuvenation
- Biogerontology

=== Fields not included ===
Research domains related or part of senescence research currently not fully included in the timeline:

- Senolytic
- Establishments of new research-conducting organizations, especially companies (see template at the bottom)
- Research into centenarians
- Ageing research projects and prizes

=== Excluded fields of research ===
Notable events in these fields of research that relate to life extension and healthspan are currently deliberately not included in this timeline

- History of nutritional science – progress in general health- and lifespan-related nutritional science
- List of causes of death by rate – such as R&D on the reduction of environmental toxins
  - Years of potential life lost (YPLL) and Loss of life expectancy (LLE)
- General medicine and preventive healthcare and interventions against any specific aging-related disease
  - Progress in tools and knowledge that can be used for anti-aging purposes such as CRISPR gene editing
  - General regeneration in humans, organ printing and xenotransplantation progress
  - Research about sustained brain health in general
- Maintaining health – conventional ways of maintaining and protecting health for life extension
  - Health effects of exercise
  - Neurobiological effects of physical exercise
  - Public health / health policy including environmental policy and consumer protection
