= Outline of life extension =

The following outline is provided as an overview of and topical guide to life extension:

Life extension – study of slowing down or reversing the processes of aging to extend both the maximum and average lifespan. Also known as anti-aging medicine, experimental gerontology, and biomedical gerontology.

== Goals ==
- Biological immortality
- Indefinite lifespan
- Longevity
- Rejuvenation

== Longevity ==
- Centenarian
- Supercentenarian
- Longevity escape velocity

== Strategies ==
=== Research and development ===
- Timeline of senescence research

=== Available strategies ===
- Calorie restriction or protein restriction or intermittent fasting
- Exercise
- Geroprotector
- Senolytics

=== Potential future strategies ===
- Cryonics
- Genetic therapies
  - Cloning and body part replacement
  - Cell replacement therapies (CRT)
- Strategies for engineered negligible senescence (SENS)
- Digital immortality through mind uploading
- Suspended animation
- Immunisation
- Gene editing
- Senolytic Drugs
- Nanotechnology

== Aging ==
- Evolution of ageing
- Gerontology
- Pro-aging trance

=== Hallmarks of aging ===
- Altered intercellular communication
- Cellular senescence
- Deregulated nutrient sensing
- Epigenetic alterations
- Genomic instability
- Loss of proteostasis
- Mitochondrial dysfunction
- Stem cell exhaustion
- Telomere attrition

=== Causes of aging ===
- Cross-links
  - Crosslinking of DNA
- Free radicals – atom, molecule, or ion that has unpaired valence electrons. With some exceptions, these unpaired electrons make free radicals highly chemically reactive towards other substances, or even towards themselves: their molecules will often spontaneously dimerize or polymerize if they come in contact with each other. They are countered to some extent by antioxidants.
- Glycation
  - Advanced glycation end-product
- Lipofuscin
- Viral infections (acute or chronic)

==== Theories of aging ====
Theories of aging

- Antagonistic pleiotropy theory of aging
- Caloric restriction theory
- Cross-linkage theory of aging
- Death hormone theory
- Disposable soma theory of aging
- DNA damage theory of aging
- Epigenetic clock theory of aging
- Error catastrophe theory of aging
- Errors and Repairs Theory
- Free-radical theory of aging
- Gene mutation theory
- Genetic control theory
- Glycation theory of aging
- Hayflick limit theory
- Inflammation theory of aging
- Immunological theory of aging
- Log-normal theory of mortality
- Membrane theory of aging
- Mitochondrial Free Radical Theory of Aging
- Mitochondrial Theory of Aging
- Mutation accumulation theory of aging
- Neuroendocrine theory of aging
- Order to disorder theory of aging
- Rate of living theory
- Redundant DNA theory
- Reliability theory of aging and longevity
- Reproductive-cell cycle theory
- Somatic mutation theory of aging
- Telomeric theory of aging
- Theory of programmed death
- Thermodynamic theory of aging
- Thymic-stimulating theory
- Waste accumulation theory

== Organizations ==
- Alcor Life Extension Foundation
- Altos Labs
- Alliance for Aging Research
- American Academy of Anti-Aging Medicine
- American Aging Association
- BioViva
- Buck Institute for Research on Aging
- Calico
- Cryonics Institute
- International Longevity Alliance
- LEV Foundation
- Life Extension Advocacy Foundation
- Life Extension Foundation
- Methuselah Foundation – non-profit organization dedicated to extending the healthy human lifespan by advancing tissue engineering and regenerative medicine therapies. It was co-founded in 2003 by Aubrey de Grey and David Gobel, and is based in Springfield, Virginia, United States.
- SENS Research Foundation – 501(c)(3) non-profit organization co-founded by Michael Kope, Aubrey de Grey, Jeff Hall, Sarah Marr and Kevin Perrott, which is based in Mountain View, California, United States. Its activities include research programs and public relations work for the application of regenerative medicine to aging.

== Notable people ==
- Aubrey de Grey
- Leonard Hayflick
- Zoltan Istvan
- Saul Kent
- Cynthia Kenyon
- Durk Pearson
- Sandy Shaw
- David Andrew Sinclair
- Roy Walford
- Michael D. West

== See also ==
- Attempts to engineer biological immortality in humans
- Timeline of senescence research
- Outline of transhumanism
- Degeneration (medical)
  - Degenerative disease
  - Neurodegeneration
