= Biogerontology =

Sub-field of gerontology

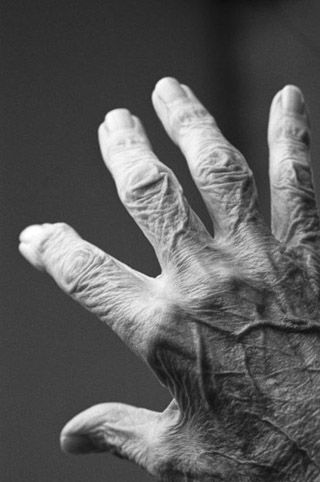
The hand of an older adult

Life expectancy in various countries of the world in 2019

Biogerontology is the sub-field of gerontology concerned with the biological aging process, its evolutionary origins, and potential means to intervene in the process. The term "biogerontology" was coined by S. Rattan, and came in regular use with the start of the journal Biogerontology in 2000. It involves interdisciplinary research on the causes, effects, and mechanisms of biological aging.

Biogerontologist Leonard Hayflick has said that the natural average lifespan for a human is around 92 years and, if humans do not invent new approaches to treat aging, they will be stuck with this lifespan. James Vaupel has predicted that life expectancy in industrialized countries will reach 100 for children born after the year 2000. Many surveyed biogerontologists have predicted life expectancies of more than three centuries for people born after the year 2100. Other scientists, more controversially, suggest the possibility of unlimited lifespans for those currently living. For example, Aubrey de Grey offers the "tentative timeframe" that with adequate funding of research to develop interventions in aging such as strategies for engineered negligible senescence, "we have a 50/50 chance of developing technology within about 25 to 30 years from now that will, under reasonable assumptions about the rate of subsequent improvements in that technology, allow us to stop people from dying of aging at any age". The idea of this approach is to use presently available technology to extend lifespans of currently living humans long enough for future technological progress to resolve any remaining aging-related issues. This concept has been referred to as longevity escape velocity.

Biomedical gerontology, also known as experimental gerontology and life extension, is a sub-discipline of biogerontology endeavoring to slow, prevent, and even reverse aging in both humans and animals.

== Approaches to aging ==
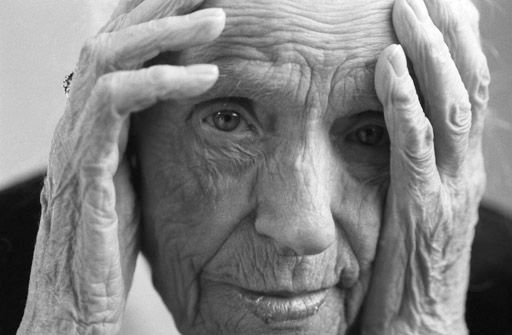
Wrinkled skin on the face is a characteristic feature of old people.

Biogerontologists vary in the degree to which they focus on the study of the aging process as a means of mitigating the diseases of aging, or as a method for extending lifespan. A relatively new interdisciplinary field called geroscience focuses on preventing diseases of aging and prolonging the 'healthspan' over which an individual lives without serious illness. The approach of biogerontologists is that aging is disease per se and should be treated directly, with the ultimate goal of having the probability of individual dying be independent of their age (if external factors are held constant). This is in contrast to the opinion that maximum life span can not, or should not, be altered.

Biogerontology should not be confused with geriatrics, which is a field of medicine that studies the treatment of existing disease in aging people, rather than the treatment of aging itself.

There are numerous theories of aging, and no one theory has been entirely accepted. At their extremes, the wide spectrum of aging theories can be categorized into programmed theories – which imply that aging follows a biological timetable, and error theories – which suggest aging occurs due to cumulative damage experienced by organisms.

== Stochastic theories ==
Stochastic theories of aging are theories suggesting that aging is caused by small changes in the body over time and the body's failure to restore the system and mend the damages to the body. Cells and tissues are injured due to the accumulation of damage over time resulting in the diminished functioning of organs. The notion of accumulated damage was first introduced in 1882 by biologist Dr. August Weismann as the "wear and tear" theory.

=== Wear and tear theories ===
Wear and tear theories of aging began to be introduced yet in 19th century. They suggest that as an individual ages, body parts such as cells and organs wear out from continued use. Wearing of the body can be attributable to internal or external causes that eventually lead to an accumulation of insults which surpasses the capacity for repair. Due to these internal and external insults, cells lose their ability to regenerate, which ultimately leads to mechanical and chemical exhaustion. Some insults include chemicals in the air, food, or smoke. Other insults may be things such as viruses, trauma, free radicals, cross-linking, and high body temperature.

=== Accumulation ===
Accumulation theories of aging suggest that aging is bodily decline that results from an accumulation of elements, whether introduced to the body from the environment or resulting from cell metabolism.

=== Mutation accumulation theory ===
Mutation accumulation theory was first proposed by Peter Medawar in 1952 as an evolutionary explanation for biological ageing and the associated decline in fitness that accompanies it. The theory explains that, in the case where harmful mutations are only expressed later in life, when reproduction has ceased and future survival is increasingly unlikely, then these mutations are likely to be unknowingly passed on to future generations. In this situation the force of natural selection will be weak, and so insufficient to consistently eliminate these mutations. Medawar posited that over time these mutations would accumulate due to genetic drift and lead to the evolution of what is now referred to as ageing.

=== Free radical theory ===
Free radicals are reactive molecules produced by cellular and environmental processes, and can damage the elements of the cell such as the cell membrane and DNA and cause irreversible damage. The free-radical theory of aging proposes that this damage cumulatively degrades the biological function of cells and impacts the process of aging. The idea that free radicals are toxic agents was first proposed by Rebeca Gerschman and colleagues in 1945, but came to prominence in 1956, when Denham Harman proposed the free-radical theory of aging and even demonstrated that free radical reactions contribute to the degradation of biological systems. Oxidative damage of many types accumulate with age, such as oxidative stress that oxygen-free radicals, because the free radical theory of aging argues that aging results from the damage generated by reactive oxygen species (ROS). ROS are small, highly reactive, oxygen-containing molecules that can damage a complex of cellular components such as fat, proteins, or from DNA; they are naturally generated in small amounts during the body's metabolic reactions. These conditions become more common as humans grow older and include diseases related to aging, such as dementia, cancer and heart disease. Amount of free radicals in the cell can be reduced with help of antioxidants. But there's a problem that some free radicals are used by organism as signal molecules, and too active general reduction of free radicals causes to organism more harm than good. Some time ago idea of slowing aging using antioxidants were very popular but now high doses of antioxidants are considered harmful. At present some scientists try to invent approaches of local suppression of free radicals only in certain places of cells. Efficiency of such approach remains to be unclear, research is ongoing.

=== DNA damage theories ===
DNA damage has been one of the major causes in diseases related to aging. The stability of the genome is defined by the cells machinery of repair, damage tolerance, and checkpoint pathways that counteracts DNA damage. One hypothesis proposed by physicist Gioacchino Failla in 1958 is that damage accumulation to the DNA causes aging. The hypothesis was developed soon by physicist Leó Szilárd. This theory has changed over the years as new research has discovered new types of DNA damage and mutations, and several theories of aging argue that DNA damage with or without mutations causes aging.

DNA damage is distinctly different from mutation, although both are types of error in DNA. DNA damage is an abnormal chemical structure in DNA, while a mutation is a change in the sequence of standard base pairs. The theory that DNA damage is the primary cause of aging is based, in part, on evidence in human and mouse that inherited deficiencies in DNA repair genes often cause accelerated aging. There is also substantial evidence that DNA damage accumulates with age in mammalian tissues, such as those of the brain, muscle, liver and kidney (see DNA damage theory of aging and DNA damage (naturally occurring)). One expectation of the theory (that DNA damage is the primary cause of aging) is that among species with differing maximum life spans, the capacity to repair DNA damage should correlate with lifespan. The first experimental test of this idea was by Hart and Setlow who measured the capacity of cells from seven different mammalian species to carry out DNA repair. They found that nucleotide excision repair capability increased systematically with species longevity. This correlation was striking and stimulated a series of 11 additional experiments in different laboratories over succeeding years on the relationship of nucleotide excision repair and life span in mammalian species (reviewed by Bernstein and Bernstein). In general, the findings of these studies indicated a good correlation between nucleotide excision repair capacity and life span. Further support for the theory that DNA damage is the primary cause of aging comes from study of Poly ADP ribose polymerases (PARPs). PARPs are enzymes that are activated by DNA strand breaks and play a role in DNA base excision repair. Burkle et al. reviewed evidence that PARPs, and especially PARP-1, are involved in maintaining mammalian longevity. The life span of 13 mammalian species correlated with poly(ADP ribosyl)ation capability measured in mononuclear cells. Furthermore, lymphoblastoid cell lines from peripheral blood lymphocytes of humans over age 100 had a significantly higher poly(ADP-ribosyl)ation capability than control cell lines from younger individuals.

=== Cross-linking theory ===
The cross-linking theory proposes that advanced glycation end-products (stable bonds formed by the binding of glucose to proteins) and other aberrant cross-links accumulating in aging tissues is the cause of aging. The crosslinking of proteins disables their biological functions. The hardening of the connective tissue, kidney diseases, and enlargement of the heart are connected to the cross-linking of proteins. Crosslinking of DNA can induce replication errors, and this leads to deformed cells and increases the risk of cancer.

== Genetic ==
Genetic theories of aging propose that aging is programmed within each individual's genes. According to this theory, genes dictate cellular longevity. Programmed cell death, or apoptosis, is determined by a "biological clock" via genetic information in the nucleus of the cell. Genes responsible for apoptosis provide an explanation for cell death, but are less applicable to death of an entire organism. An increase in cellular apoptosis may correlate to aging, but is not a 'cause of death'. Environmental factors and genetic mutations can influence gene expression and accelerate aging.

More recently epigenetics have been explored as a contributing factor. The epigenetic clock, which relatively objectively measures the biological age of cells, are useful tool for testing different anti-aging approaches. The most famous epigenetic clock is Horvath's clock, but now already more accurate analogues have appeared.

== General imbalance ==
General imbalance theories of aging suggest that body systems, such as the endocrine, nervous, and immune systems, gradually decline and ultimately fail to function. The rate of failure varies system by system.

=== Immunological theory ===
The immunological theory of aging suggests that the immune system weakens as an organism ages. This makes the organism unable to fight infections and less able to destroy old and neoplastic cells. This leads to aging and will eventually lead to death. This theory of aging was developed by Roy Walford in 1969. According to Walford, incorrect immunological procedures are the cause of the process of aging. Walford, who stated that his optimized health regime would allow him to live to 120, died of amytrophic lateral sclerosis at age 79.

== See also ==
- Antagonistic pleiotropy hypothesis
- Hallmarks of aging
- Biomarkers of aging
- Aging and memory
- Old age
- Research into centenarians
- Longevity escape velocity
- List of life extension topics
- Timeline of senescence research
