= Richard M. Suzman =

Neuro-economics, social neuroscience researcher

Richard M. Suzman (1942–2015) was an American researcher.

== Biography ==
Born in South Africa, Suzman participated in the anti-apartheid movement as a teenager, prompting his move to London in 1961. Subsequently, he enrolled at Harvard College.

Suzman completed a postdoctoral program at Stanford University before joining the University of California, San Francisco. He later became the director of the Behavioral and Social Research division at the National Institute on Aging (NIA). In his role at the NIA, Suzman connected researchers across various disciplines and shaped research proposals.

Suzman was instrumental in creating a global network of aging surveys, initiating with the Health and Retirement Study in the United States. These surveys provided insights into the relationship between financial and health issues and revealed health disparities between middle-aged individuals in the United States and Britain. The data also contributed to the understanding of longevity disparities among different social classes.

Suzman also supported the field of behavioral economics during his tenure at the National Institutes of Health.

Suzman died in 2015.
