= NACDA =

NACDA may refer to:

- National Archive of Computerized Data on Aging
- National Association of Collegiate Directors of Athletics
