= Geroscience =

Geroscience is an interdisciplinary field of biomedical research that studies the biological mechanisms of aging and their relationship to chronic disease, age-related conditions, functional decline, and healthspan.

The field is based on the geroscience hypothesis, which proposes that biological processes of aging contribute to multiple age-related diseases and that studying these shared mechanisms may support approaches to extending healthy years of life rather than addressing each age-related disease separately.

== History and institutional development ==
Research connecting aging biology with age-related disease gained institutional attention in the early 21st century. In 2007, Nature reported on research efforts examining whether aging and disease could be studied through a shared biological framework.

In 2008, Senate Report 110-527 described the Interdisciplinary Research Consortium in Geroscience as an NIH-supported effort intended to foster collaboration among researchers from multiple fields. The report stated that the consortium would connect research on the fundamental mechanisms of aging with research on age-associated diseases and technologies of value to the geroscience community.

The trans-NIH Geroscience Interest Group (GSIG) was launched within the National Institutes of Health in 2012 to encourage collaboration across NIH institutes and centers on the relationship between aging biology and disease biology.

In 2013, the trans-NIH GeroScience Interest Group hosted the summit Advances in Geroscience: Impact on Healthspan and Chronic Disease. The meeting was organized to promote collaboration between the aging and chronic disease research communities and to identify research directions related to healthspan and chronic disease burden.

== Relationship to related fields ==
Geroscience overlaps with, but is not identical to gerontology, geriatrics, and biogerontology. Gerontology is the broader study of aging across biological, cognitive, cultural, psychological, and social dimensions. Geriatrics is a medical specialty focused on health care and disease treatment in older adults. Biogerontology focuses on the biological processes of aging.

Geroscience is more specifically concerned with the mechanisms by which aging biology contributes to age-related disease and functional decline. It has been described as operating at the interface of biogerontology and geriatrics because it connects basic aging biology with disease-oriented and translational research.

The similarly named GeroScience is a scientific journal focused on the biology of aging and the pathophysiology of age-related diseases. It is distinct from geroscience as a field of research.

== Research focus ==
Geroscience research examines shared biological processes associated with aging. These processes are often discussed in relation to the hallmarks or pillars of aging, including genomic instability, telomere attrition, epigenetic alterations, loss of proteostasis, disabled macroautophagy, deregulated nutrient sensing, mitochondrial dysfunction, cellular senescence, stem cell exhaustion, altered intercellular communication, chronic inflammation, and dysbiosis.

The geroscience approach differs from disease-by-disease research by focusing on common aging-related biological pathways that may influence multiple chronic diseases or age-related conditions. In translational research, geroscience has been described as an effort to define and modify aging-related biological pathways with the goals of slowing age-related disability, preventing age-related diseases, and increasing disability-free survival.

The case made here is that going after the biology of aging is more likely to protect health and function in old age than treating illnesses one by one, because aging is the largest risk for the main causes of sickness in later life and the one most often left out.

== Clinical translation and limitations ==
Geroscience has attracted interest because many chronic diseases and conditions, including stroke, heart failure, dementia, many cancers, coronary artery disease, and physical disability, increase with age. A 2025 review in JAMA described geroscience as a relatively new discipline focused on defining and modifying aging-related biological pathways.

The clinical translation of geroscience remains an active area of research. A 2025 article in Nature Aging noted that, while geroscience has potential for identifying approaches to improve healthspan, challenges include long research timelines, uncertainty around surrogate biomarkers of aging, and possible biological trade-offs from interventions.

A proposed clinical trial known as Targeting Aging with Metformin (TAME) is designed to test whether metformin delays the appearance of a second age-related disease in people who already have one such condition.

The authors propose one shared process for judging which medicines the U.S. Food and Drug Administration has already approved are worth a trial aimed at aging.

That process, they write, would let the next trial be designed on the pattern of TAME, the Targeting Aging with Metformin study.

== Academic centers studying geroscience ==
Name	Academic Affiliation	Website URL
Institute for Geroscience	Albert Einstein College of Medicine / Montefiore	Website
Oklahoma Center for Geroscience and Healthy Brain Aging	University of Oklahoma Health Sciences Center / OU Health	Website
Center for Translational Geroscience	Cedars-Sinai Health Sciences University	Website
Centre for Geroscience and Geromedicine	Lee Kong Chian School of Medicine, Nanyang Technological University	Website

== See also ==
- Ageing
- Biogerontology
- Cellular senescence
- Geriatrics
- Gerontology
- GeroScience
- Hallmarks of aging
- Healthspan
- Life extension
- Senescence
