= CALERIE =

Medical trial

CALERIE (Comprehensive Assessment of Long-term Effects of Reducing Intake of Energy) is a trial currently underway in the U.S. to study the effects of prolonged calorie restriction on healthy human subjects.

The CALERIE study is being carried out at the Pennington Biomedical Research Center (Baton Rouge, Louisiana), the Jean Mayer USDA Human Nutrition Research Center on Aging at Tufts University (Boston, Massachusetts) and the Washington University School of Medicine (St. Louis, Missouri). It is hoped that caloric restriction reduces the incidence of cardiovascular disease and cancer and leads to a longer life, as has been demonstrated previously in numerous animal studies. CALERIE is the first study to investigate prolonged calorie restriction in healthy humans. Study subjects are selected from people who are not obese (because calorie restriction on obese people is already known to lengthen life, but possibly for different reasons).

A smaller predecessor study ended in 2006. Forty-eight subjects were randomly assigned to a control group and a treatment group; those in the treatment group were put on a 25% calorie reduction over a 6-month period. It was found that the treatment group had lower insulin resistance, lower levels of LDL cholesterol, lower body temperature and blood-insulin levels as well as less oxidative damage to their DNA.

The second, larger, phase of CALERIE began in 2007. The participants are subjected to a 25% calorie restriction over a 2-year period, and several physiological variables are regularly monitored. Participants are paid $5,000 at Tufts and Pennington and $2,400 at Washington University. As of October 2009 the study had 132 participants and was still accepting new ones.

Study subjects have to be highly motivated and organized enough to keep a detailed journal of all foods they eat. Their daily baseline calorie requirements are precisely determined before the trial: in a two-week laboratory test the rate of carbon dioxide production is measured, allowing to compute the number of burned calories. The subjects are then taught a diet of low-energy density foods, such as vegetables, fruits (especially apples), insoluble fiber and soups. Most subjects reported that they felt hungry for the first few weeks, after which they adjusted to the new diet. Complaints focused on the rigid bookkeeping scheme imposed on them.

Results were posted to the Clinical Trial website in 2018 with a (paywalled) Lancet article published in 2019. MSN published article based on an interview with Dr Kraus.

== Background ==
That calorie restriction (CR) might lengthen human lifespan was suggested by various studies on laboratory animals. However, when the studies were extended to long-lived primates (rhesus monkeys), while it was indeed found in a 2012 study by the US National Institute on Aging (NIA) that CR had benefits to immune function, motor coordination, and resistance to sarcopenia, a CR regimen implemented in rhesus monkeys of various ages did not improve survival outcomes.

The authors considered that the study suggested "a separation between health effects, morbidity and mortality", and that "study design, husbandry and diet composition may strongly affect the life-prolonging effect of CR in a long-lived non-human primate".
