= National Alzheimer's Project Act =

The National Alzheimer's Project Act is an Act in the United States that was driven by the rapid increasing number of sufferers of Alzheimer's disease. It resulted in a U.S. National Alzheimer's Plan for increased spending on scientific research, care, and public engagement.

== Development ==
The National Alzheimer's Project Act was initially developed due to recommendations from a taskforce created in 2009, and was authored by Senator Susan Collins and Senator Evan Bayh, before being signed into law by President Barack Obama on January 4, 2011. Named the 'Alzheimer's Study Group', the taskforce consisted of health policy experts and was co-chaired by former House Speaker Rep. Newt Gingrich and Sen. Bob Kerrey. They assessed the current status of response to the burden of Alzheimer's disease, looked at the current trajectory for coping with this burden, and determined whether current policy was sufficient. They concluded in their 52-page report, entitled 'A National Alzheimer’s Strategic Plan: The Report of the Alzheimer’s Study Group' that the 'national effort to address Alzheimer’s disease has lacked coordination and focus, and has been woefully underfunded relative to the scale of the mounting crisis'.

== Details ==
A National Plan to address Alzheimer's disease was subsequently released on May 15, 2012 by the U.S. Department of Health and Human Services.

This national plan has 5 goals:

1. Prevent and effectively treat Alzheimer's disease and related dementia by 2025
2. Optimize Care Quality and Efficiency
3. Expand Supports for People with Alzheimer's Disease and Their Families.
4. Enhance Public Awareness and Engagement.
5. Track Progress and Drive Improvement.

To inform the National Plan, the U.S. Department of Health and Human Services worked with the U.S. Department of Veterans Affairs (VA), the National Science Foundation (NSF), and the U.S. Department of Defense (DoD) to create an Interagency group.

This group also consisted of Health and Human Services representatives from the following agencies:

- Office of the Assistant Secretary for Planning and Evaluation
- Office of the Assistant Secretary for Health
- National Institute on Aging
- Centers for Medicare & Medicaid Services
- Centers for Disease Control and Prevention
- Administration on Aging
- Health Resources and Services Administration
- Agency for Healthcare Research and Quality
- Substance Abuse and Mental Health Services Administration
- Food and Drug Administration
- Indian Health Service
- Administration for Children and Families

== Follow-up and output ==
=== Reports ===
Reports on each goal are generated yearly.

=== Budgets ===
The National Alzheimer's Project Act recommended $2 billion a year to achieve their goal of preventing and treating Alzheimer's disease by 2025. In 2017, a bill was approved to boost government funding for Alzheimer's disease to almost $1.4 billion for the fiscal year. In 2015, Congress requested that a 'professional judgement', or 'bypass' budget be created for Alzheimer's disease. This budget goes directly to Congress and the President, and in biomedicine has only been seen previously in the fields of cancer and AIDS.

== Global context ==
The existence of the National Alzheimer's Project Act means that the U.S. joins 31 other countries and territories around the world who have developed a plan for dementia. In May 2017, the World Health Organization established a Global Action Plan for Dementia, focusing on the public health response.
