= Dimu Kotsovsky =

Romanian gerontologist, physician, psychologist, writer

Dimu Anatoli Kotsovsky was a gerontologist, physician, psychologist, writer. Before World War II he worked in Chișinău, which at that time was a part of the Kingdom of Romania.

Kotsovsky became active in the field of longevity research and advocacy in the early 1920s. For example, in 1925 his book "the problem of senility" was printed in Russian. In 1929 the American scientific journal published Kotsovsky's article The origin of senility (the original Genezis Starosti was presumably created in 1923). Kotsovsky wrote in German, French, English, Romanian, Italian and Russian. He used "cataloguing" approach, systematizing the knowledge and theories that existed at that time. Contrary to most aging researchers of that time, who tried to solve the problem of senescence by one operation or concentrated their efforts on one aging process or one organ system, Kotsovsky considered that there is not any one particular rejuvenation remedy that is enough to defeat the aging process. And to have success in understanding aging and counteracting it, scientists should combine dispersed knowledge from various fields of biomedicine. Therefore, Kotsovsky can be rightfully named one of the pioneers of the interdisciplinary approach in the study of aging and longevity.

In 1933, by his own means, Dimu Kotsovsky organized and at first maintained the world's first institute dedicated to study of aging and longevity (Romanian: Institutul Pentru Studiul și Combaterea Bătrâneții = German: Institut für Altersforschung und Altersbekämpfung = English: Institute for the Study and Fighting Aging). After some time the institute was recognized by the Romanian government. The Institute’s honorary members included the biochemists Emil Abderhalden and Casimir Funk, the physicians Max Bürger and Eugen Steinach, the philosopher Oswald Spengler, the Nobel Laureate in Physiology or Medicine Hans Spemann, the Nobel Laureate in Chemistry Theodor Svedberg, and about 80 other famous scientists of that time from all over the world, including USSR, South America and Japan.

In 1936 Kotsovsky established the first European (and the first Western) journal, dedicated to the subjects of aging and longevity. During its first year the journal had the name Monatsberichte (monthly reports), and in 1937 it was renamed to German: Altersprobleme: Zeitschrift für Internationale Altersforschung und Altersbekämpfung = English: "Problems of Aging: Journal for the International Study and Combat of Aging". The materials in the journal were mostly in German, less in French and English. The journal had an interdisciplinary approach and contained a variety of materials related to the various aspects of aging.

According to the opinion of some experts, due to the work of Dimu Kotsovsky and the related work of the laboratories of his colleagues Gheorghe Marinescu and Grigore Benetato, the then-existing Kingdom of Romania can arguably be named one of the leading countries in the field of aging research in the 1930s.

In 1940, as a consequence of the Molotov–Ribbentrop Pact, Romania was forced to cede part of its territory to the Soviet Union, including Chișinău, where the Moldavian SSR was formed. The new authorities closed the institute of Kotsovsky. The institute was reopened when, after the outbreak of World War II, Chișinău was taken by the Axis forces. Kotsovsky continued his active scientific work during World War II. At this time, he published his work mainly in German and Austrian scientific journals.

In 1944 Kotsovsky moved to Munich (West Germany), where after the completion of the war, he continued his activity. Kotsovsky published his last books in 1960. At this period, the focus of his work began to move in the direction of geriatrics, and philosophy began to occupy more and more space. For example, he argued that civilization, on the one hand, reduces lifespan (due to a decrease in the quality of food and environmental conditions, increased uncertainty and stressfulness of life), but on the other hand, increased it (due to improvement of medicine and preventive hygiene). Dimu Kotsovsky pointed to various problems that civilization produces, where the evolutionary selection is no longer based on the positive characteristics of people. And he concluded that the tragedy of the modern situation of humanity can only be solved by what gave rise to this situation – science and technology.

The year of his death remains in question.

== See also ==
- Timeline of senescence research
