= Alliance for Aging Research =

American nonprofit organization

- Founded: 1986
- Founder: Daniel Perry
- Type: Non-profit organization
- Purpose: Aging research, health education, public policy
- Location: Washington, D.C., United States
- Region served: United States
- Methods: Advocacy, education, coalition-building, congressional briefings
- Key people: Susan Peschin (President & CEO)
- Affiliations: Friends of NIA, Alliance for a Stronger FDA, CAMR, ACT-AD, Partnership to Fight Chronic Disease
- Website: agingresearch.org

The Alliance for Aging Research is a non-profit organization based in Washington, D.C., that promotes medical research to improve the human experience of aging. Founded in 1986 by Daniel Perry, the Alliance also advocates and implements health education for consumers and health professionals.

The Alliance is governed by a board of directors. Susan Peschin is the chief executive officer and president.

== Activities ==
=== Policy ===
Main policy areas include aging research funding, FDA funding, stem cell research funding, and improving health care for older Americans. The Alliance holds congressional briefings to increase awareness of such diseases and conditions as osteoporosis, Alzheimer's disease, oral care and diabetes.

==== Coalitions ====
The Alliance also serves on several coalitions and committees including Friends of the National Institute on Aging (NIA), the Alliance for a Stronger FDA, Coalition for the Advancement of Medical Research (CAMR), Partnership to Fight Chronic Disease, and the National Coalition on Mental Health and Aging.

==== White House Conference on Aging ====
The Alliance has been a part of the once-a-decade White House Conference on Aging, helping the President and Congress adopt resolutions to make aging research a national priority.

==== Task Force on Aging Research Funding ====
The Alliance collaborates with many patient and advocacy organizations on the annual Task Force on Aging Research Funding, a call to action to Congress and other national policymakers.

==== ACT-AD Coalition ====
ACT-AD (Accelerate Cure/ Treatments for Alzheimer's Disease) is a coalition of more than 50 organizations working to accelerate the development of treatments and a cure for Alzheimer's disease.

==== Healthspan Campaign ====
The Healthspan Campaign was established on December 2nd, 2012, by former Alliance chief executive officer Fred Perry. The Campaign is a long-term agenda for the funding and research of aging longevity. The Campaign's main goal is the idea that an increase in lifespan longevity over time will reduce healthcare costs.

Research supported by the Healthspan Campaign recommends the usage of palliative anti-aging drugs to give elderly patients 7 or more years of life longevity back. Further support is being pushed into the field of anti-aging drug research.

=== Programs ===
The Alliance produces materials focused on healthy aging and chronic disease, particularly for the Baby Boomer population. The Alliance has developed resources on the following topics: Age-related macular degeneration, Alzheimer's disease and caregivers, osteoporosis, heart disease, Parkinson's disease, and cancer, among others.

The Baby Boomer population now includes about 78 million Americans—27 million are ages 55–62 and 51 million are ages 44–54. This generation will begin reaching age 65 in 2011—increasing the need for healthy aging and chronic disease research.

The Alliance has also developed a database called The Silver Book that compiles facts, statistics, graphs and data from hundreds of sources. A brief version of the online database is available in print form. Data is available for diabetes, vision loss, neurological diseases, cardiovascular disease, cancer, and osteoporosis.

=== Events ===
Every year the Alliance holds its Bipartisan Congressional Awards Dinner to highlight how policymakers work together to advance aging research and celebrate recent achievements.

In 2008, the Alliance presented the Florence S. Mahoney Making A Difference Award, which honors an individual for his or her contribution to the medical research community, to Erik Fatemi. The award remembers Florence S. Mahoney, who was instrumental in the foundation of the National Institute on Aging.

From 2002 to 2008, the Alliance has hosted "Aged to Perfection", a wine tasting fundraiser bringing together individuals and experts from the biotechnology, health, finance, political and wine communities in order to show support for aging research.

== COVID-19 ==
The Alliance received two grants from Pfizer in 2021 for a total of $120,000, the majority of which went towards a "COVID-19 Vaccine Education and Equity Project". The project established the Champions for Vaccine Education, Equity, and Progress (CVEEP) as its main provider of information on the COVID-19 vaccine. With 60 other organizations supporting the cause, the Vaccine Education and Equity Project was focused primarily on providing the FDA vaccine trial and review processes to the public.

== See also ==
- Aging-associated diseases
- Geriatrics
- Research into centenarians
- Gerontology
- National Institute on Aging
