= Reproductive-cell cycle theory =

Theory

The reproductive-cell cycle theory posits that the hormones that regulate reproduction act in an antagonistic pleiotrophic manner to control aging via cell cycle signaling; promoting growth and development early in life in order to achieve reproduction, but later in life, in a futile attempt to maintain reproduction, become dysregulated and drive senescence. Rather than seeing aging as a loss of functionality as we get older, this theory defines aging as any change in an organism over time, as evidenced by the fact that if all chemical reactions in the body were stopped, no change, and thus no aging, would occur. Since the most important change in an organism through time is the chemical reactions that result in a single cell developing into a multicellular organism, whatever controls these chemical reactions that regulate cell growth, development, and death, is believed to control aging. The theory argues that these cellular changes are directed by reproductive hormones of the hypothalamic-pituitary-gonadal axis (HPG axis). Receptors for reproductive hormones (such as estrogens, progestogens, androgens and gonadotropins) have been found to be present in all tissues of the body. Thus, HPG axis hormones normally promote growth and development of the organism early in life in order to achieve reproduction. Hormones levels then begin to change in men around age 30 and more abruptly in women when they reach menopause, around age 50. When the HPG axis becomes unbalanced, cellular growth and development is dysregulated, and cell death and dysfunction can occur, both of which can initiate senescence, the accumulated damage to cells, tissues, and organs that occurs with the passage of time and that is associated with functional loss during aging.

Evidence supporting this theory comes from disease studies showing that women who reach menopause later have less heart disease and stroke, less dementia, and less osteoporosis, supporting the theory that the longer the HPG axis is in balance, the less likely one is to develop age-related diseases. Conversely, early surgical menopause has been demonstrated to increase the incidence of these diseases. However, the most compelling supportive evidence is from studies of Hormone Replacement Therapy (HRT). Research with women and men undertaking HRT has shown that taking sex hormones that are biologically identical to human hormones delays the onset, decreases the incidence of, and can reverse the course of age related illnesses such as heart disease, Alzheimer's disease, osteoporosis, and some types of cancer. However, only biological hormones appear to have these effects. The use of non-human or synthetic hormones has been shown to increase the risk of certain of these diseases. Compellingly, 18 studies have demonstrated an increase in longevity for those women taking HRT.

Further studies in support of the theory have shown that suppressing the HPG axis, such as when organisms experience either caloric restriction, cold, or exercise stress, increases lifespan. This is thought to be an evolutionary conserved mechanism that allows organisms to suppress HPG axis signaling and reproduction, thereby conserving reproductive resources (germ cells) for a later time when the environment is better suited to raising offspring. By having the same hormones regulate both reproduction and aging, an animal is able to modulate its fertility and its rate of aging based on environmental conditions.

Recent parabiosis studies prove many of the tenets of the Reproductive Cell-Cycle Theory of Aging. In these experiments, where a young mouse is coupled surgically with an aged mouse, circulating factors from the young mouse rejuvenates the tissues of the old mice. In particular, these studies indicate the importance of circulating factors in regulating the maintenance of neuronal (Villeda et al., 2011), vascular (Katsimpardi et al., 2014), muscular and liver (Conboy et al., 2005; Sinha et al., 2014) structure and function.

== See also ==
- Endocrinology of reproduction
