= Biomarkers of aging =

Type of biomarkers

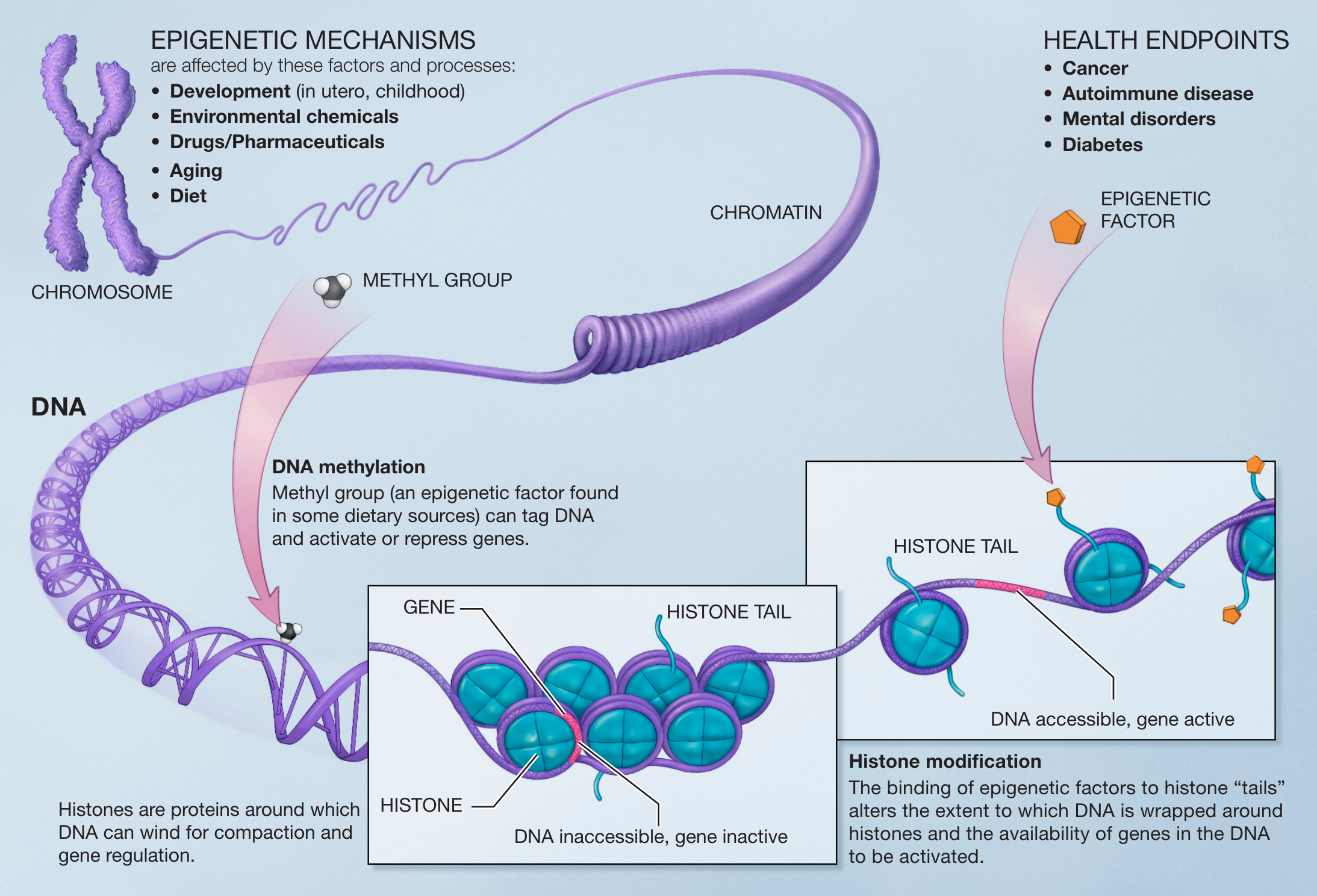
Chromosomes during methylation

Biomarkers of aging are biomarkers that could predict functional capacity at some later age better than chronological age. Stated another way, biomarkers of aging would give the true "biological age", which may be different from the chronological age.

Validated biomarkers of aging would allow for testing interventions to extend lifespan, because changes in the biomarkers would be observable throughout the lifespan of the organism. Although maximum lifespan would be a means of validating biomarkers of aging, it would not be a practical means for long-lived species such as humans because longitudinal studies would take far too much time. Ideally, biomarkers of aging should assay the biological process of aging and not a predisposition to disease, should cause a minimal amount of trauma to assay in the organism, and should be reproducibly measurable during a short interval compared to the lifespan of the organism. An assemblage of biomarker data for an organism could be termed its "ageotype".

Graying of hair and skin wrinkles increase with age and are valid biomarker of ageing, even though to what extent they and other common age-related changes in appearance are better indicators of future functionality than chronological age is not firmly established yet. Biogerontologists have continued efforts to find and validate biomarkers of aging, but success thus far has been limited. Levels of CD4 and CD8 memory T cells and naive T cells have been used to give good predictions of the expected lifespan of middle-aged mice.

Advances in big data analysis allowed for the new types of "aging clocks" to be developed. The epigenetic clock is a promising biomarker of aging and can accurately predict human chronological age. Further studies of the hematological clock on the large datasets from South Korean, Canadian, and Eastern European populations demonstrated that biomarkers of aging may be population-specific and predictive of mortality. It is also possible to predict the human chronological age using the transcriptomic clock.

== Epigenetic markers ==
=== Loss of histones ===
A new epigenetic marker found in studies of aging cells is the loss of histones. Most evidence shows that loss of histones is linked to cell division. In aging and dividing yeast MNase-seq (Micrococcal Nuclease sequencing) showed a loss of nucleosomes of ~50%. Proper histone dosage is important in yeast as shown from the extended lifespans seen in strains that are overexpressing histones. A consequence of histone loss in yeast is the amplification of transcription. In younger cells, genes that are most induced with age have specific chromatin structures, such as altered nuclear positioning, lack of a nucleosome-depleted region (NDR) at the promoter, weak chromatin phasing, a higher frequency of TATA elements, and higher occupancy of repressive chromatin factors. In older cells, however, the same genes nucleosome loss at the promoter is more prevalent which leads to higher transcription of these genes.

This phenomenon is not only seen in yeast, but has also been seen in aging worms, during aging of human diploid primary fibroblasts, and in senescent human cells. In human primary fibroblasts, reduced synthesis of new histones was seen to be a consequence of shortened telomeres that activate the DNA damage response. Loss of core histones may be a general epigenetic mark of aging across many organisms.

=== Histone variants ===
In addition to the core histones, H2A, H2B, H3, and H4, there are other versions of the histone proteins that can be significantly different in their sequence and are important for regulating chromatin dynamics. Histone H3.3 is a variant of histone H3 that is incorporated into the genome independent of replication. It is the major form of histone H3 seen in the chromatin of senescent human cells, and it appears that excess H3.3 can drive senescence.

There are multiple variants of histone 2, the one most notably implicated in aging is macroH2A. The function of macroH2A has generally been assumed to be transcriptional silencing; most recently, it has been suggested that macroH2A is important in repressing transcription at Senescence-Associated Heterochromatin Foci (SAHF). Chromatin that contains macroH2A is impervious to ATP-dependent remodeling proteins and to the binding of transcription factors.

=== Histone modifications ===
Increased acetylation of histones contributes to chromatin taking a more euchromatic state as an organism ages, similar to the increased transcription seen due to the loss of histones. There is also a reduction in the levels of H3K56ac during aging and an increase in the levels of H4K16ac. Increased H4K16ac in old yeast cells is associated with the decline in levels of the HDAC Sir2, which can increase the life span when overexpressed.

Methylation of histones has been tied to life span regulation in many organisms, specifically H3K4me3, an activating mark, and H4K27me3, a repressing mark. In C. elegans, the loss of any of the three Trithorax proteins that catalyze the trimethylation of H3K4 such as, WDR-5 and the methyltransferases SET-2 and ASH-2, lowers the levels of H3K4me3 and increases lifespan. Loss of the enzyme that demethylates H3K4me3, RB-2, increases H3K4me3 levels in C. elegans and decreases their life spans. In the rhesus macaque brain prefrontal cortex, H3K4me2 increases at promoters and enhancers during postnatal development and aging. These increases reflect progressively more active and transcriptionally accessible (or open) chromatin structures that are often associated with stress responses such as the DNA damage response. These changes may form an epigenetic memory of stresses and damages experienced by the organism as it develops and ages.

UTX-1, a H3K27me3 demethylase, plays a critical role in the aging of C.elegans: increased utx-1 expression correlates with a decrease in H3K27me3 and a decrease in lifespan. Utx-1 knockdowns showed an increase in lifespan Changes in H3K27me3 levels also have affects on aging cells in Drosophila and humans.

=== DNA methylation ===
Methylation of DNA is a common modification in mammalian cells. The cytosine base is methylated and becomes 5-methylcytosine, most often when in the CpG context. Hypermethylation of CpG islands is associated with transcriptional repression and hypomethylation of these sites is associated with transcriptional activation. Many studies have shown that there is a loss of DNA methylation during ageing in many species such as, rats, mice, cows, hamsters, and humans. It has also been shown that DNMT1 and DNMT3a decrease with aging and DNMT3b increases.

Hypomethylation of DNA can lower genomic stability, induce the reactivation of transposable elements, and cause the loss of imprinting, all of which can contribute to cancer progression and pathogenesis.

== Immune biomarkers ==
Recent data suggests that an increased frequency of senescent CD8+ T cells in the peripheral blood is associated with the development of hyperglycemia from a pre-diabetic state suggestive of senescence playing a role in metabolic aging. Senescent Cd8+ T cells could be utilized as a biomarker to signal the transition from pre-diabetes to overt hyperglycemia.

Recently, Hashimoto and coworkers profiled thousands of circulating immune cells from supercentenarians at single-cell resolution. They identified a unique increase in cytotoxic CD4 T cells in these supercentenarians. Generally, CD4 T-cells have helper, but not cytotoxic, functions under physiological conditions however these supercentenarians, subjected to single cell profiling of their T-cell receptors, revealed accumulations of cytotoxic CD4 T-cells through clonal expansion. The conversion of helper CD4 T-cells to a cytotoxic variety might be an adaptation to the late stage of aging aiding in the fighting infections and potentially enhancing tumor surveillance.

== Applications of aging biomarkers ==
The main mechanisms identified as potential biomarkers of aging are DNA methylation, loss of histones, and histone modification. The uses for biomarkers of aging are ubiquitous and identifying a physical parameter of biological aging would allow humans to determine our true age, mortality, and morbidity. The change in the physical biomarker should be proportional to the change in the age of the species. Thus after establishing a biomarker of aging, humans would be able to dive into research on extending life spans and finding timelines for the arise of potential genetic diseases.

One of the applications of this finding would allow for identification of the biological age of a person. DNA methylation uses the structure of DNA at different stages of life to determine an age. DNA methylation is the methylation of the cysteine in the CG or Cpg region. The hypermethylation of this region is associated with decreased transcriptional activity and the opposite for hypomethylation. In other words, the more "tightly" held the DNA region then the more stable and "younger" the species. Looking at DNA methylation's properties in tissues, it was found to be almost zero for embryonic tissues, it can be used to determine acceleration of age and the results can be reproduced in chimpanzee tissue.

More recently, biomarkers of aging has been used in multiple clinical trials to measure slowing or reversing of age-related decline or biological aging. The Biomarkers of Aging Consortium is currently examining the application of these biomarkers to identify longevity interventions and ways to validate them. Moreover, open-source resources, such as the R package methylCIPHER and the Python package pyaging are available to the public as hubs for several biomarkers of aging.

== See also ==
- Epigenetic clock
- Hallmarks of aging
- Biomarker (medicine)
- Senescence
