= Rebeca Gerschman =

Argentinian biologist and physiologist

- Born: June 19, 1903; Carlos Casares, Argentina
- Died: April 4, 1986 (aged 82); Buenos Aires, Argentina
- Education: University of Buenos Aires
- Scientific career
- Doctoral advisor: Dr. Bernardo Houssay

Rebeca Gerschman (June 19, 1903 – April 4, 1986) was an Argentine biologist and physiologist who received a Ph.D. in Biochemistry and Pharmacy from the University of Buenos Aires. Known for her advances in the field of biochemistry, she was the first scientist to propose—in 1954—that free radicals contributed to oxygen toxicity and cell aging and death. After receiving two successive degrees in biochemistry and pharmacy, she achieved her Ph.D. in 1937. Her thesis was about the determination of potassium in plasma. Following her Ph.D., she began researching at the University of Rochester and published her famous paper on oxygen poisoning. She was the first to suggest that oxygen free radicals caused cell death and aging. After years of researching, Gerschman returned to the University of Buenos Aires and began teaching in the Physiology Department. She retired at the age of 77 from teaching and died several years later in 1986 from aplastic anemia.

== Early life and education ==
Born to a wealthy ranching family in Carlos Casares, Argentina, Rebeca was able to attend school at a young age. When she was old enough, she attended the University of Buenos Aires and received two degrees in Pharmacy and Biochemistry. Following her undergraduate degrees, she began her Ph.D. under the Nobel Prize in Physiology or Medicine recipient Bernardo Houssay. She completed her Ph.D. in 1937 about the determination of potassium in plasma. She worked with Agustín D. Marenzi to establish the Gerschman-Marenzi Method used for studying blood potassium levels and concentrations.

== Post doctorate ==
After completing her Ph.D., she moved to New York and began working at the University of Rochester in Wallace O. Fenn's Department of Physiology. The research she conducted at the University of Rochester was a continuation of her Ph.D. work on blood potassium until she changed her studies to the physiological effects of respiratory gases on rabbits. Her work at the University of Rochester was partially related to post World War 2 military medicine. In 1953 she wrote her famous paper, “Oxygen poisoning and x-radiation: a mechanism in common”, however, it was not widely accepted in the science community because it opposed the scientific literature and views of the time. Gerschman was the first scientist to propose in 1954, that a toxic oxygen free radical reaction occurred in cells causing them to age and die. The Gerschman Theory about the relationship of oxygen to aging and diseases was not accepted until 1969 due to the work of McCord and Fridovich on superoxide dismutase enzymes which confirmed her theory.

== Teaching ==
In 1959, she was appointed a professor of Physiology at the new school of Pharmacy and Biochemistry at the University of Buenos Aires and moved back to Argentina. Gerschman was considered an unconventional teacher at the University of Buenos Aires because she used scientific cinema to visually show students topics and invited people from topic fields to speak in person. In 1970, she was awarded the consulting professor position and retired from the University of Buenos Aires in 1980 at 77 years old.

== Later life ==
Gerschman became a huge advocate for women’s rights in the scientific field because of her experiences. In the 1980s, Gerschman was considered for the Nobel Prize in Physiology or Medicine, sadly she did not receive the award because she was not able to participate in the interviews. After years of being ill with aplastic anemia, Gerschman died on April 4, 1986, at the age of 82.

== Awards ==
In her honor there is the Rebeca Gerschman Award.

== Notable citations ==
- Gerschman, R. (1954). Oxygen poisoning and x-irradiation: a mechanism in common. In Glutathione (pp. 288–291). Academic Press.
- Gerschman, R., Gilbert, D. L., & Caccamise, D. (1958). Effect of various substances on survival times of mice exposed to different high oxygen tensions. American Journal of Physiology. Legacy Content, 192(3), 563-571.
- Fenn, W. O., & Gerschman, R. (1950). The loss of potassium from frog nerves in anoxia and other conditions. The Journal of general physiology, 33(3), 195.
- Gerschman, R., & Fenn, W. O. (1953). Ascorbic acid content of adrenal glands of rat in oxygen poisoning. American Journal of Physiology. Legacy Content, 176(1), 6-8.
- Gerschman, R., Gilbert, D. L., Nye, S. W., Nadig, P. W., & Fenn, W. O. (1954). Role of adrenalectomy and adrenal-cortical hormones in oxygen poisoning. American Journal of Physiology. Legacy Content, 178(2), 346-350.
