= National Archive of Computerized Data on Aging =

University of Michigan archival program on aging

The National Archive of Computerized Data on Aging (NACDA) is a program located within Inter-university Consortium for Political and Social Research at the University of Michigan, and funded by the US National Institute on Aging. Its mission is to advance research on aging by helping researchers to access the under-exploited potential of a broad range of datasets.

NACDA acquires and preserves data relevant to gerontological research, processing as needed to promote effective research use, disseminates them to researchers, and facilitates their use. By preserving and making available the largest library of electronic data on aging in the United States, NACDA offers opportunities for secondary analysis on major issues of scientific and policy relevance.

== Description ==
The NACDA collection consists of over sixteen hundred datasets relevant to gerontological research and represents the world's largest collection of publicly available research data on the aging lifecourse.

== History ==
The NACDA Program on Aging began in 1976 under the sponsorship of the United States Administration on Aging (AoA). At that time NACDA was seen as a novel experiment - neither the concept of a research archive devoted to aging issues nor the idea of making research data freely available to the public were well established. Over the years, NACDA’s mission has changed both in scope and in direction. Originally conceived as a storehouse for data, NACDA has aggressively pursued a role of increasing involvement in the research community by actively promoting and distributing data. In 1984, the National Institute of Aging became the sponsor of the National Archive of Computerized Data on Aging, which has flourished under its support. Over the years, NACDA has evolved and grown in response to changes in technology. In many instances, leading the pace of change in methodology related to the storage, protection, and distribution of data.

NACDA was one of the first organizations to develop and release studies on CD-ROM. NACDA was also one of the first archives to experiment with the idea of offering electronic research data as a public good, free to all interested individuals at no charge. The initial collection of 28 public use datasets first offered on the internet in 1992 has now expanded to over 1,600 datasets that are freely available to any researcher. The entire collection is stored online at the NACDA website, offering immediate access to gerontological researchers.

== See also ==
- National Institute on Aging
- United States Administration on Aging
- National Health and Nutrition Examination Survey
