= Hallmarks of aging =

Types of irreversible biochemical changes

Aging has been characterized by a progressive loss of physiological integrity, leading to impaired function and increased vulnerability to death. The hallmarks of aging are the types of biochemical changes that occur in all organisms that experience biological aging and lead to a progressive loss of physiological integrity, impaired function and, eventually, death. They were first listed in a landmark paper in 2013 to conceptualize the essence of biological aging and its underlying mechanisms.

The following three premises for the interconnected hallmarks have been proposed:

- "their age-associated manifestation"
- "the acceleration of aging by experimentally accentuating them"
- "the opportunity to decelerate, stop, or reverse aging by therapeutic interventions on them"

== Overview ==
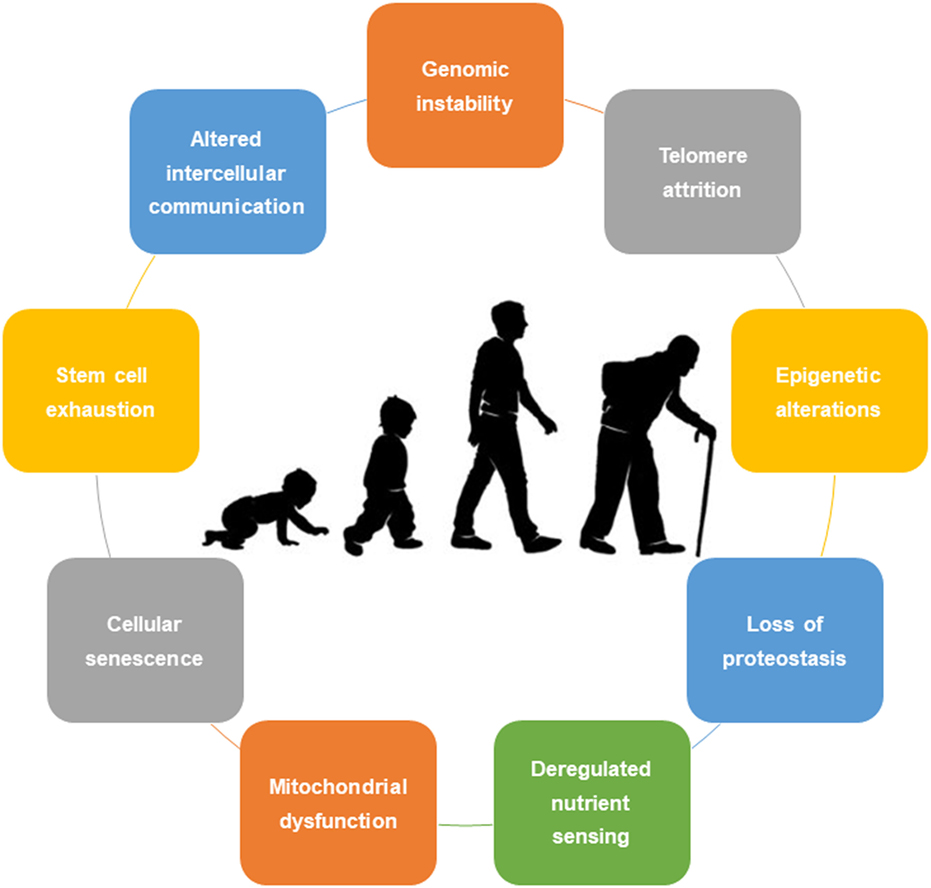
The hallmarks of aging

Over time, almost all living organisms experience a gradual and irreversible increase in senescence and an associated loss of proper function of the bodily systems. As aging is the primary risk factor for major human diseases, including cancer, diabetes, cardiovascular disorders, and neurodegenerative diseases, it is important to describe and classify the types of changes that it entails.

After a decade, the authors of the heavily cited original paper updated the set of proposed hallmarks in January 2023. In the new review, three new hallmarks have been added: macroautophagy, chronic inflammation and dysbiosis, totaling 12 proposed hallmarks.

The nine hallmarks of aging of the original paper are grouped into three categories as below:

Primary hallmarks (causes of damage)

- Genome instability
- Telomere shortening (or telomere attrition)
- Epigenetic alterations
- Loss of proteostasis
- macroautophagy

Antagonistic hallmarks (responses to damage)

- Deregulated nutrient sensing
- Mitochondrial dysfunction
- Cellular senescence

Integrative hallmarks (culprits of the phenotype)

- Stem cell exhaustion
- Altered intercellular communication
- chronic inflammation
- dysbiosis

Primary hallmarks are the primary causes of cellular damage. Antagonistic hallmarks are antagonistic or compensatory responses to the manifestation of the primary hallmarks. Integrative hallmarks are the functional result of the previous two groups of hallmarks that lead to further operational deterioration associated with aging.

A 2024 review by the group that created the framework examined papers citing both versions of it. It concluded that the framework had influenced many areas of ageing research and related fields. It had also served as a template for similar "hallmarks" schemes in other subjects. The same authors noted that, like any simplification, the framework has limitations and needs regular revision as evidence accumulates.

A 2023 review by the same authors expanded the framework to twelve hallmarks, adding disabled macroautophagy, chronic inflammation, and dysbiosis.

== The hallmarks ==
Each hallmark was chosen to try to fulfill the following criteria:

1. manifests during normal aging;
2. experimentally increasing it accelerates aging;
3. experimentally amending it slows the normal aging process and increases healthy lifespan.

These conditions are met to different extents by each of these hallmarks. The last criterion is the most difficult to achieve, and not all of the hallmarks are fully supported yet by interventions that succeed in ameliorating aging.

=== Genome instability ===
Proper functioning of the genome is one of the most important prerequisites for the smooth functioning of a cell and the organism as a whole. Alterations in the genetic code have long been considered one of the main causal factors in aging. In multicellular organisms genome instability is central to carcinogenesis, and in humans it is also a factor in some neurodegenerative diseases such as amyotrophic lateral sclerosis or the neuromuscular disease myotonic dystrophy.

Abnormal chemical structures in the DNA are formed mainly through oxidative stress and environmental factors. A number of molecular processes work continuously to repair this damage. Unfortunately, the results are not perfect, and thus damage accumulates over time. Several review articles have shown that deficient DNA repair, allowing greater accumulation of DNA damages, causes premature aging; and that increased DNA repair facilitates greater longevity.

=== Telomere shortening ===
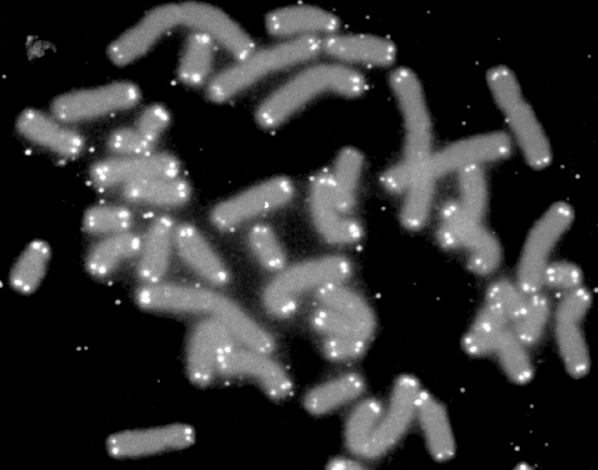
Human chromosomes (gray) capped with telomeres (white)

Telomeres are regions of repetitive nucleotide sequences associated with specialized proteins at the ends of linear chromosomes. They protect the terminal regions of chromosomal DNA from progressive degradation and ensure the integrity of linear chromosomes by preventing DNA repair systems from mistaking the ends of the DNA strand for a double strand break.

Telomere shortening is associated with aging, mortality and aging-related diseases. Normal aging is associated with telomere shortening in both humans and mice, and studies on genetically modified animal models suggest causal links between telomere erosion and aging. Leonard Hayflick demonstrated that a normal human fetal cell population will divide between 40 and 60 times in cell culture before entering a senescence phase. Each time a cell undergoes mitosis, the telomeres on the ends of each chromosome shorten slightly. Cell division will cease once telomeres shorten to a critical length. This is useful when uncontrolled cell proliferation (like in cancer) needs to be stopped, but detrimental when normally functioning cells are unable to divide when necessary.

An enzyme called telomerase elongates telomeres in gametes and stem cells. Telomerase deficiency in humans has been linked to several aging-related diseases related to loss of regenerative capacity of tissues. It has also been shown that premature aging in telomerase-deficient mice is reverted when telomerase is reactivated. The shelterin protein complex protects telomeres from the DNA repair machinery in eukaryotes.

=== Epigenomic alterations ===
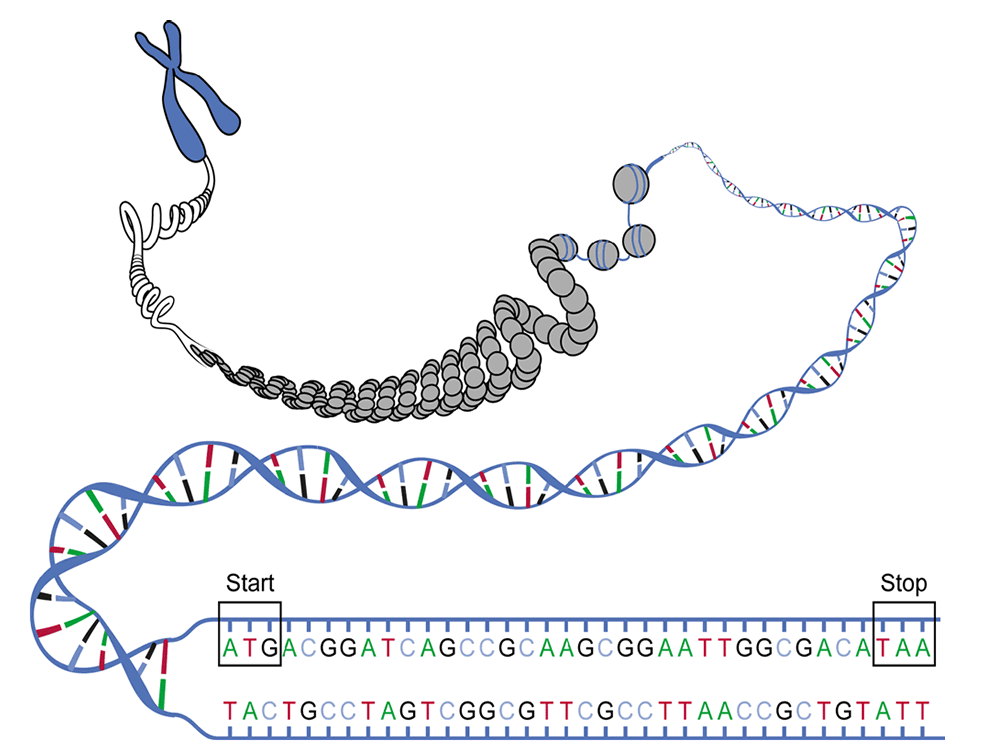
DNA condensation–the DNA chain is wrapped around histones, which form into coils, which wrap into ever larger coils that ultimately make up the chromosome.

Out of all the genes that make up a genome, only a subset are expressed at any given time. The functioning of a genome depends both on the specific order of its nucleotides (genomic factors), and also on which sections of the DNA chain are spooled on histones and thus rendered inaccessible, and which ones are unspooled and available for transcription (epigenomic factors). Depending on the needs of the specific tissue type and environment that a given cell is in, histones can be modified to turn specific genes on or off as needed. The profile of where, when and to what extent these modifications occur (the epigenetic profile) changes with aging, turning useful genes off and unnecessary ones on, disrupting the normal functioning of the cell.

As an example, sirtuins are a type of protein deacetylases that promote the binding of DNA onto histones and thus turn unnecessary genes off. These enzymes use NAD as a cofactor. With aging, the level of NAD in cells decreases and so does the ability of sirtuins to turn off unneeded genes at the right time. Decreasing the activity of sirtuins has been associated with accelerated aging and increasing their activity has been shown to stave off several age-related diseases.

=== Loss of proteostasis ===
Proteostasis is the homeostatic process of maintaining all the proteins necessary for the functioning of the cell in their proper shape, structure and abundance. Protein misfolding, oxidation, abnormal cleavage or undesired post-translational modification can create dysfunctional or even toxic proteins or protein aggregates that hinder the normal functioning of the cell. Though these proteins are continually removed and recycled, formation of damaged or aggregated proteins increases with age, leading to a gradual loss of proteostasis. This can be slowed or suppressed by caloric restriction or by administration of rapamycin, both through inhibiting the mTOR pathway.

=== Deregulated nutrient sensing ===
Nutrient sensing is a cell's ability to recognize, and respond to, changes in the concentration of macronutrients such as glucose, fatty acids and amino acids. In times of abundance, anabolism is induced through various pathways, the most well-studied among them the mTOR pathway. When energy and nutrients are scarce, the AMPK receptor senses this and switches off mTOR to conserve resources.

In a growing organism, growth and cell proliferation are important and thus mTOR is upregulated. In a fully grown organism, mTOR-activating signals naturally decline during aging. It has been found that forcibly overactivating these pathways in grown mice leads to accelerated aging and increased incidence of cancer. mTOR inhibition methods like dietary restriction or administering rapamycin have been shown to be one of the most robust methods of increasing lifespan in worms, flies and mice.

=== Mitochondrial dysfunction ===
Mitochondrion

The mitochondrion is the powerhouse of the cell. Different human cells contain from several up to 2500 mitochondria, each one converting carbon (in the form of acetyl-CoA) and oxygen into energy (in the form of ATP) and carbon dioxide.

During aging, the efficiency of mitochondria tends to decrease. The reasons for this are still quite unclear, but several mechanisms are suspected: reduced biogenesis, accumulation of damage and mutations in mitochondrial DNA, oxidation of mitochondrial proteins, and defective quality control by mitophagy.

Dysfunctional mitochondria contribute to aging through interfering with intracellular signaling and triggering inflammatory reactions.

=== Cellular senescence ===
Under certain conditions, a cell will exit the cell cycle without dying, instead becoming dormant and ceasing its normal function. This is called cellular senescence. Senescence can be induced by several factors, including telomere shortening, DNA damage and stress. Since the immune system is programmed to seek out and eliminate senescent cells, it might be that senescence is one way for the body to rid itself of cells damaged beyond repair.

The links between cell senescence and aging are several:

- The proportion of senescent cells increases with age.
- Senescent cells secrete inflammatory markers which may contribute to aging.
- Clearance of senescent cells has been found to delay the onset of age-related disorders.

=== Stem cell exhaustion ===
Stem cells are undifferentiated or partially differentiated cells with the unique ability to self-renew and differentiate into specialized cell types. For the first few days after fertilization, the embryo consists almost entirely of stem cells. As the fetus grows, the cells multiply, differentiate and assume their appropriate function within the organism. In adults, stem cells are mostly located in areas that undergo gradual wear (intestine, lung, mucosa, skin) or need continuous replenishment (red blood cells, immune cells, sperm cells, hair follicles).

Loss of regenerative ability is one of the most obvious consequences of aging. This is largely because the proportion of stem cells and the speed of their division gradually lowers over time. It has been found that stem cell rejuvenation can reverse some of the effects of aging at the organismal level.

=== Altered intercellular communication ===
Different tissues and the cells they consist of need to orchestrate their work in a tightly controlled manner so that the organism as a whole can function. One of the main ways this is achieved is through excreting signal molecules into the blood where they make their way to other tissues, affecting their behavior. The profile of these molecules changes as we age.

One of the most prominent changes in cell signaling biomarkers is "inflammaging", the development of a chronic low-grade inflammation throughout the body with advanced age. The normal role of inflammation is to recruit the body's immune system and repair mechanisms to a specific damaged area for as long as the damage and threat are present. The constant presence of inflammation markers throughout the body wears out the immune system and damages healthy tissue.

It's also been found that senescent cells excrete a specific set of molecules called the SASP (Senescence-Associated Secretory Phenotype) which induce senescence in neighboring cells. Conversely, lifespan-extending manipulations targeting one tissue can slow the aging process in other tissues as well.

=== Disabled macroautophagy ===
The 2023 update made the age-related decline of macroautophagy a hallmark in its own right, placing it among the primary hallmarks. Macroautophagy lets cells break down and replace worn-out organelles, which is necessary for normal cell function. The 2013 paper had treated macroautophagy as part of the loss of proteostasis. Later findings strengthened the case for listing it separately, such as the appearance of ageing features when autophagy is blocked. Mice engineered to overexpress autophagy-promoting proteins such as Atg5 live longer and stay healthy for longer.

=== Chronic inflammation ===
Chronic inflammation, or inflammaging, is one of two integrative hallmarks added in 2023. It is closely tied to the other one, dysbiosis. It refers to a persistent low-grade inflammatory state that develops with age and can have various triggers. Higher blood levels of interleukin 6 have been linked to higher all-cause mortality in older people.

=== Dysbiosis ===
Dysbiosis, the third hallmark added in 2023, is an age-related disturbance of the microbiota. The microbiota is the community of microorganisms living on the skin and on internal body surfaces that are open to the outside. In progeroid mice, fecal microbiota transplantation, which aims to correct dysbiosis, has increased both lifespan and healthspan.

=== Further hallmarks ===
These may constitute further hallmarks or underlying mechanisms that drive multiple of these hallmarks.

Researchers at a 2022 symposium in Copenhagen on "new hallmarks of ageing" proposed several candidates beyond the original nine. These were compromised autophagy, disturbance of the microbiome, dysregulated RNA splicing, inflammation and altered mechanical properties of cells and their surroundings.

A 2024 review by members of the group that proposed the framework listed candidates for future versions of it. The review suggested three possible stand-alone hallmarks that the 2023 update had treated as parts of other hallmarks. These were dysregulated RNA processing, changes in extracellular matrix dynamics and altered secretion of extracellular vesicles. Other candidates were ranked by the strength of supporting evidence, which was greatest for impaired lipid metabolism and weakest for cellular enlargement. The authors concluded that the evidence was still too limited to add any of them without further research.

- Resurrection of endogenous retroviruses could be "a hallmark and driving force of cellular senescence and tissue aging" as retroviruses in the human genomes can become awakened from dormant states and contribute to aging which can be blocked by neutralizing antibodies.

== Alternative conceptual models ==
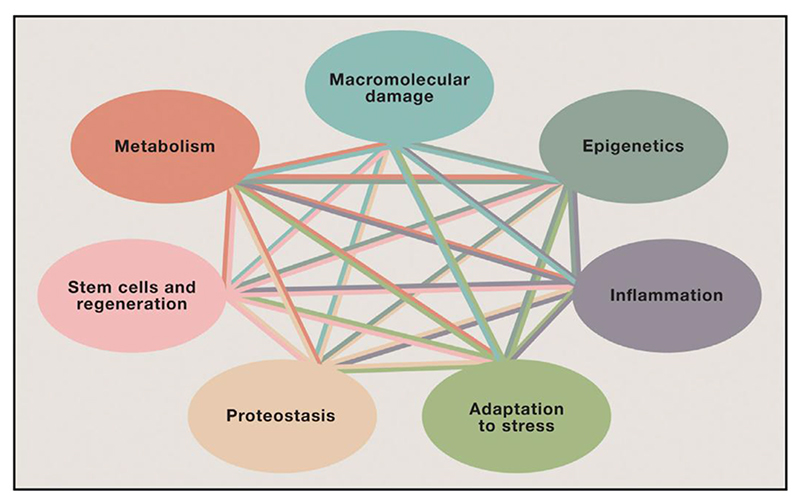
The Seven Pillars of Aging Model

In 2014, other scientists have defined a slightly different conceptual model for aging, called 'The Seven Pillars of Aging', in which just three of the 'hallmarks of aging' are included (stem cells and regeneration, proteostasis, epigenetics). The seven pillars model highlights the interconnectedness between all of the seven pillars which is not highlighted in the nine hallmarks of aging model.

== Links to other diseases or hallmarks ==
Authors of the original paper merged or linked various hallmarks of cancer with those of aging.

The authors also concluded that the hallmarks are not only interconnected among each other but also "to the recently proposed hallmarks of health, which include organizational features of spatial compartmentalization, maintenance of homeostasis, and adequate responses to stress".

== See also ==
- Biomarkers of aging
- Senescence#Theories of aging
- Ageing#Biological basis
- Aging Brain
- Life extension#Strategies
- Negligible senescence
- Strategies for engineered negligible senescence
- Stem cell theory of aging
- Timeline of senescence research
