= National Institute on Aging =

American governmental research institute

National Institute on Aging (NIA)
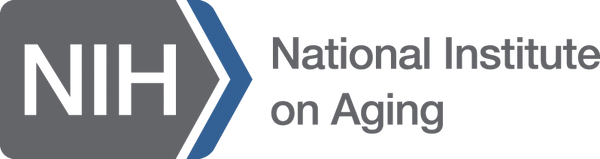

Agency overview
- Jurisdiction: Federal government of the United States
- Agency executive: Dr. Richard J. Hodes, Director
- Parent department: Department of Health and Human Services
- Parent agency: National Institutes of Health
- Website: www.nia.nih.gov

The National Institute on Aging (NIA) is a division of the U.S. National Institutes of Health (NIH), located in Bethesda, Maryland. The NIA itself is headquartered in Baltimore, Maryland.

The NIA leads a broad scientific effort to understand the nature of aging and to extend the healthy, active years of life. In 1974, under Public Law 93-296, Congress granted authority to form NIA to provide leadership in aging research, training, health information dissemination, and other programs relevant to aging and older people. In January 2011, President Obama signed into law the National Alzheimer’s Project Act, designating the NIA as the primary federal agency on Alzheimer's disease research.

In 2024 NIA is led by Director, Richard J. Hodes, M.D, and Deputy Director Amy S. Kelley, M.D.

== Past directors ==
Past directors from 1975–present

No.	Portrait	Director	Took office	Left office	Refs.
acting		Norman Kretchmer	October 1974	July 1975	
acting		Richard C. Greulich	July 1975	April 1976	
1		Robert N. Butler	May 1, 1976	July 1982	
2		Robert L. Ringler	July 16, 1982	June 30, 1983	
3		T. Franklin Williams	July 1, 1983	July 31, 1991	
acting		Gene D. Cohen	August 1, 1991	May 31, 1993	
4		Richard J. Hodes	June 1, 1993	Present	

== Mission ==
NIA's mission is to improve the health and well-being of older Americans through research, and specifically to:

- Support and conduct high-quality research on:
  - Aging processes
  - Age-related diseases
  - Special problems and needs of the aged
- Train and develop highly skilled research scientists from all population groups.
- Develop and maintain state-of-the-art resources to accelerate research progress.
- Disseminate information and communicate with the public and interested groups on health and research advances and on new directions for research.

== Programs ==
NIA sponsors research on aging through extramural and intramural programs. The extramural program funds research and training at universities, hospitals, medical centers, and other public and private organizations nationwide.

One such example is the Alzheimer’s Disease Research Centers (ADRCs). As of 2022, the NIA funds over 30 centers at medical institutions throughout the United States.

The intramural program conducts basic and clinical research in Baltimore, Maryland, and on the NIH campus in Bethesda, Maryland.

Eliezer Masliah was appointed head of the National Institute on Aging's Division of Neuroscience in 2016.

=== Interventions Testing Program ===
The Interventions Testing Program (ITP) is a peer-reviewed National Institute on Aging program designed to identify agents that extend lifespan and healthspan in mice; testing is carried out in genetically heterogeneous UM-HET3 mice at the Jackson Laboratory, the University of Michigan, and the University of Texas Health Science Center at San Antonio.

A 2009 ITP study reported that rapamycin extended median and maximal lifespan of genetically heterogeneous mice when feeding began at 600 days of age.

A 2023 review counts at least ten laboratories, outside the National Institute on Aging's own Interventions Testing Program, that have since measured whether rapamycin lengthens the life of mice.

== Government Funding History ==
Fiscal Year	Appropriation
2017	$2,048,610,000
2018	$2,574,091,000
2019	$3,083,410,000
2020	$3,543,673,000
2021	$3,899,227,000
2022	$4,219,936,000
2023	$4,407,623,000
2024	$4,507,623,000
2025	$4,507,623,000

== See also ==
- American Federation for Aging Research
- Geroscience
- Life extension
- National Archive of Computerized Data on Aging
