= Mitochondrial theory of ageing =

Theory of ageing

The mitochondrial free radical theory of ageing (MFRTA) proposes that free radicals produced by mitochondrial activity damage cellular components, leading to ageing.

The mitochondrial theory of aging has two varieties: free radical, and non-free radical. The first is one of the variants of the free radical theory of ageing. It was formulated by J. Miquel and colleagues in 1980 and was developed in the works of Linnane and coworkers (1989). The second was proposed by A. N. Lobachev in 1978.

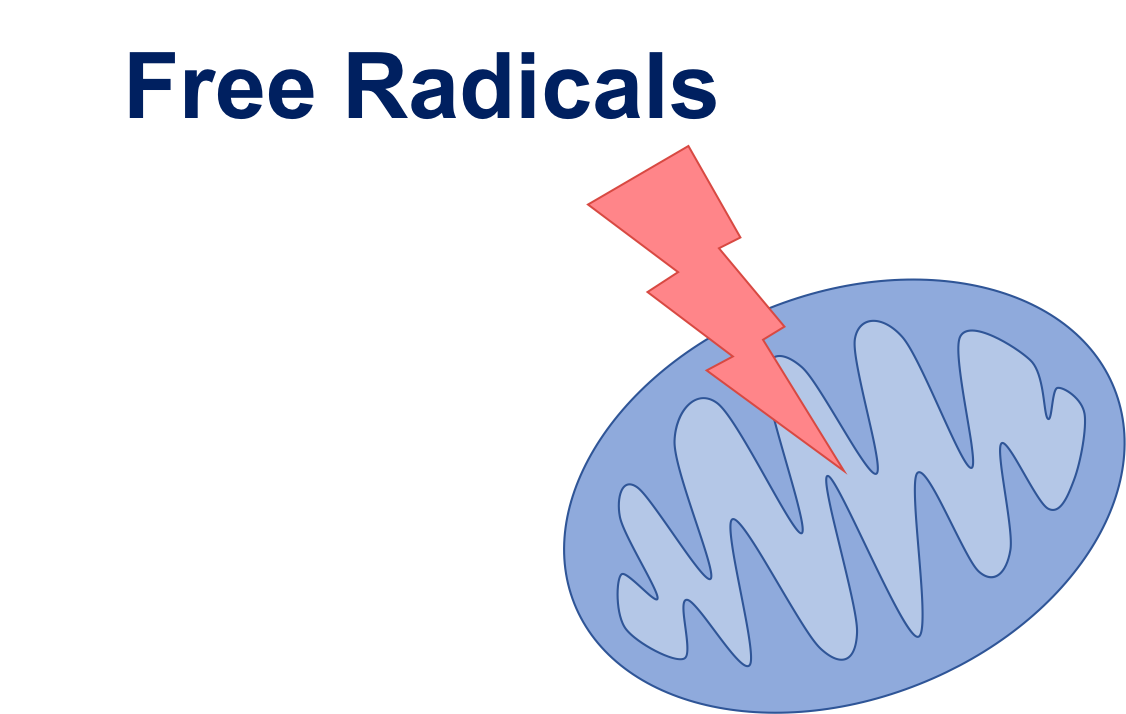
Free radicals damage mitochondria, which, according to the mitochondrial free radical theory of ageing, leads to ageing.

Mitochondria are cell organelles which function to provide the cell with energy by producing ATP (adenosine triphosphate). During ATP production electrons can escape the mitochondrion and react with water, producing reactive oxygen species (ROS). ROS can damage macromolecules, including lipids, proteins, and DNA, which is thought to facilitate the process of ageing.

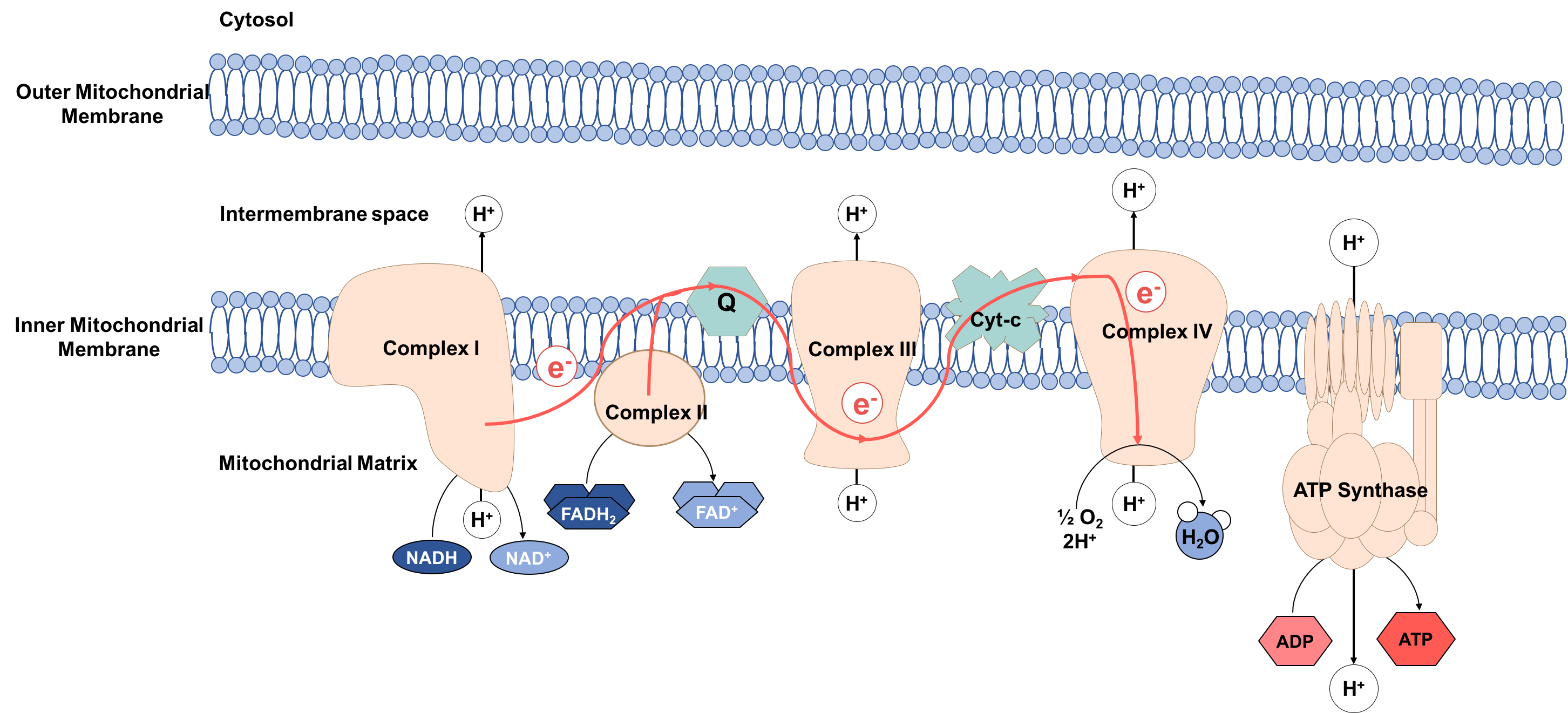
Electron transport chain in the inner mitochondrial membrane

In the 1950s Denham Harman proposed the free radical theory of ageing, which he later expanded to the MFRTA.

When studying the mutations in antioxidants, which remove ROS, results were inconsistent. However, it has been observed that overexpression of antioxidant enzymes in yeast, worms, flies and mice were shown to increase lifespan.

== Molecular basis ==
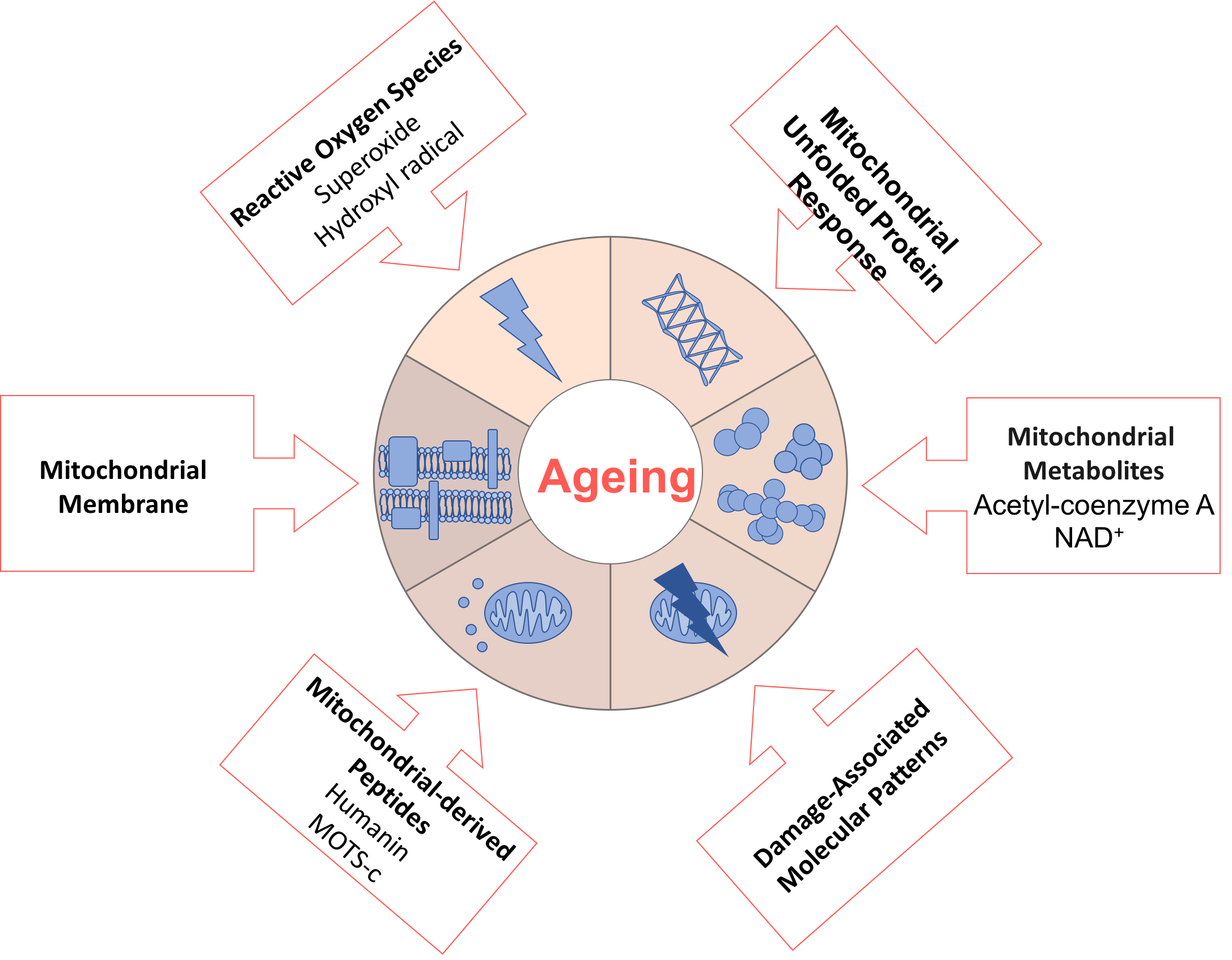
Molecular contributors to ageing (reactive oxygen species, mitochondrial unfolded protein response, mitochondrial metabolites, damage-associated molecular patterns, mitochondrial-derived peptides, mitochondrial membrane)

Mitochondria are thought to be organelles that developed from endocytosed bacteria which learned to coexist inside ancient cells. These bacteria maintained their own DNA, the mitochondrial DNA (mtDNA), which codes for components of the electron transport chain (ETC). The ETC is found in the inner mitochondrial membrane and functions to transfer energy derived from food into ATP molecules. The process is called oxidative phosphorylation, because ATP is produced from ADP in a series of redox reactions. Electrons are transferred through the ETC from NADH and FADH_{2} to oxygen, reducing oxygen to water.

=== ROS ===
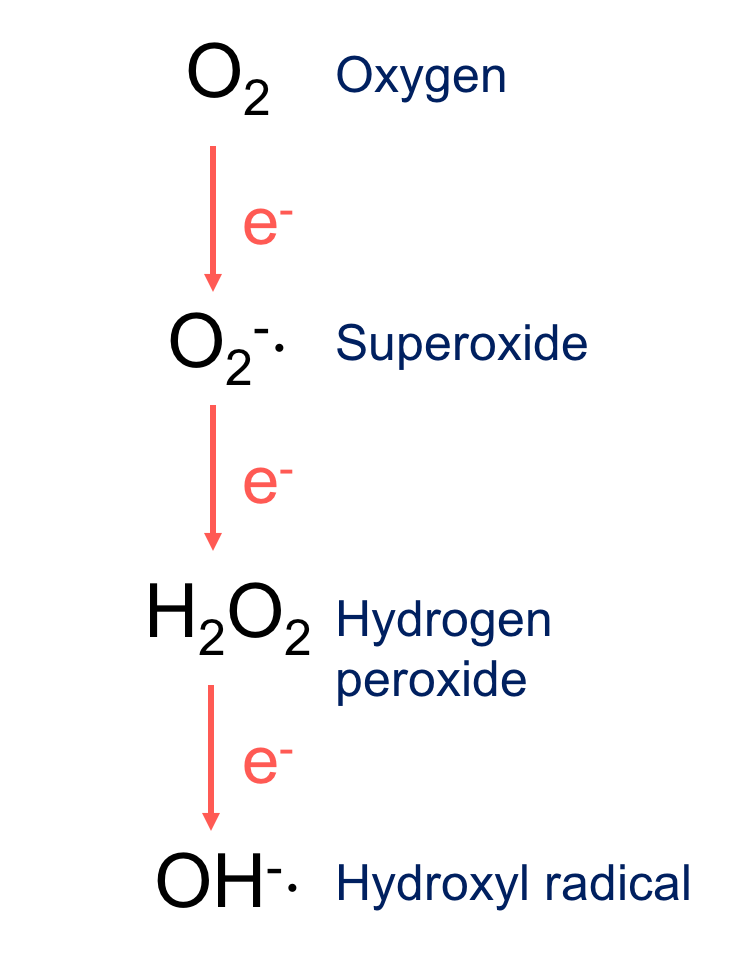
Reactive oxygen species and oxygen

ROS are highly reactive, oxygen-containing chemical species, which include superoxide, hydrogen peroxide and hydroxyl radical. If the complexes of the ETC do not function properly, electrons can leak and react with water, forming ROS. Normally leakage is low and ROS is kept at physiological levels, fulfilling roles in signaling and homeostasis. In fact, their presence at low levels lead to increased life span, by activating transcription factors and metabolic pathways involved in longevity. At increased levels ROS cause oxidative damage by oxidizing macromolecules, such as lipids, proteins and DNA. This oxidative damage to macromolecules is thought to be the cause of ageing. Mitochondrial DNA is especially susceptible to oxidative damage, due to its proximity to the site of production of these species. Damaging of mitochondrial DNA causes mutations, which may lead to the production of ETC complexes that do not function properly. This results in an increase in ROS production, which then increases oxidative damage to macromolecules.

=== UPR^{mt} ===
The mitochondrial unfolded protein response (UPR^{mt}) is turned on in response to mitochondrial stress. Mitochondrial stress occurs when the proton gradient across the inner mitochondrial membrane is dissipated, mtDNA is mutated, and/or ROS accumulates, which can lead to misfolding and reduced function of mitochondrial proteins. Stress is sensed by the nucleus, where chaperones and proteases are upregulated, which can correct folding or remove damaged proteins, respectively. Decreases in protease levels are associated with ageing, as mitochondrial stress will remain and increase ROS levels. Such mitochondrial stress and dysfunction has been linked to various age-associated diseases, including cardiovascular diseases, and type-2 diabetes.

=== Mitochondrial metabolites ===
As the mitochondrial matrix is where the TCA cycle takes place, different metabolites are commonly confined to the mitochondria. Upon ageing, mitochondrial function declines, allowing escape of these metabolites; this can induce epigenetic changes associated with ageing.

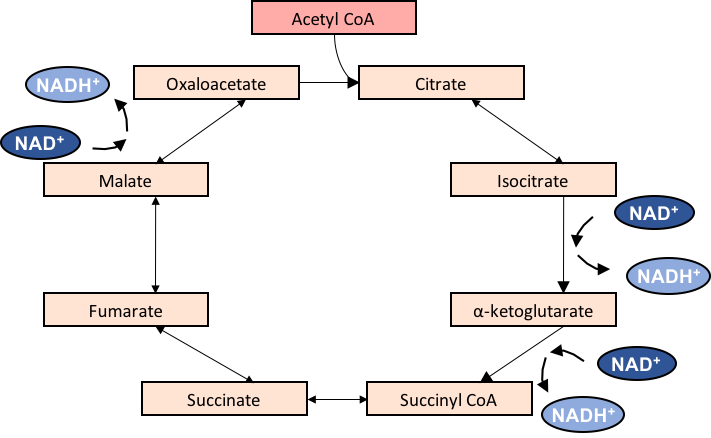
TCA cycle

Acetyl-coenzyme A (Acetyl-CoA) enters the TCA cycle in the mitochondrial matrix, and is oxidized in the process of energy production. Upon escaping the mitochondria and entering the nucleus, it can act as a substrate for histone acetylation. Histone acetylation is an epigenetic modification, which leads to gene activation. At a young age, acetyl-CoA levels are higher in the nucleus and cytosol, and its transport to the nucleus can extend lifespan in worms.

Nicotinamide Adenine Dinucleotide (NAD^{+}) is produced in the mitochondria and upon escaping to the nucleus, can act as a substrate for sirtuins. Sirtuins are a family of proteins known to play a role in longevity. Cellular NAD^{+} levels have been shown to decrease with age.

=== DAMPs ===
Damage-associated molecular patterns (DAMPs) are molecules that are released during cell stress. Mitochondrial DNA is a DAMP, which is only present outside of the mitochondria if the mitochondria is damaged. Blood mitochondrial DNA levels become elevated with age, contributing to inflamm-ageing, a chronic state of inflammation characteristic of advanced age.

=== Mitochondrial-derived peptides ===
Mitochondrial DNA has been known to encode 13 proteins. Recently, other short protein coding sequences have been identified, and their products are referred to as mitochondria-derived peptides.

The mitochondrial-derived peptide humanin has been shown to protect against Alzheimer's disease, which is considered an age-associated disease.

MOTS-c has been shown to prevent age-associated insulin resistance, the main cause of type 2 diabetes.

Humanin and MOTS-c levels have been shown to decline with age, and their activity seems to increase longevity.

=== Mitochondrial membrane ===
Almaida-Pagan and coworkers found that mitochondrial membrane lipid composition changes with age, when studying Turquoise killifish. The proportion of monounsaturated fatty acids and the overall phospholipid content decreased with age.

== History ==
In 1956 Denham Harman first postulated the free radical theory of ageing, which he later modified to the mitochondrial free radical theory of ageing (MFRTA). He found ROS as the main cause of damage to macromolecules, known as "ageing". He later modified his theory after discovering that mitochondria were producing and being damaged by ROS, leading him to the conclusion that mitochondria determine ageing. In 1972, he published his theory in the Journal of the American Geriatrics Society.

== Evidence ==
It has been observed that mitochondrial function declines with age, and mitochondrial DNA mutation increases in tissue cells in an age-dependent manner. This leads to an increase in ROS production and a potential decrease in the cell's ability to remove ROS. Most long-living animals have been shown to be more resistant to oxidative damage and have lower ROS production, linking ROS levels to lifespan. Overexpression of antioxidants, which reduce ROS, has also been shown to increase lifespan. Multiple studies have linked mitochondria to the process of ageing, including a bioinformatics analysis showing that amino acid composition of mitochondrial proteins correlates with longevity (long-living species are depleted in cysteine and methionine), as well as the discovery that disruption of ETC complexes can extend life in Caenorhabditis elegans Drosophila, and mice.

Evidence supporting the theory started to crumble in the early 2000s. Mice with reduced expression of the mitochondrial antioxidant, SOD2, accumulated oxidative damage and developed cancer, but did not age faster. Overexpression of antioxidants reduced cellular stress, but did not increase mouse life span. The naked mole-rat, which lives 10-times longer than normal mice, has been shown to tolerate higher levels of oxidative damage compared to other organisms of its size.

== See also ==
- Ageing
- Calorie Restriction
- Denham Harman
- Free radical theory of ageing
- Gerontology
