= Ageing =

Biological process of getting older

Ageing (or aging in American English) is the process of becoming older. The term refers mainly to humans, many other animals, and fungi; whereas for example, bacteria, perennial plants and some simple animals are potentially biologically immortal. In a broader sense, ageing can refer to single cells within an organism which have ceased dividing, or to the population of a species.

In humans, ageing represents the accumulation of changes in a human being over time and can encompass physical, psychological, and social changes. Reaction time, for example, may slow with age, while memories and general knowledge typically increase. Of the roughly 150,000 people who die each day across the globe, about two-thirds die from age-related causes.

Current ageing theories are assigned to the damage concept, whereby the accumulation of damage (such as DNA oxidation) may cause biological systems to fail, or to the programmed ageing concept, whereby the internal processes (epigenetic maintenance such as DNA methylation) inherently may cause ageing. Programmed ageing should not be confused with programmed cell death (apoptosis).

== Ageing versus immortality ==
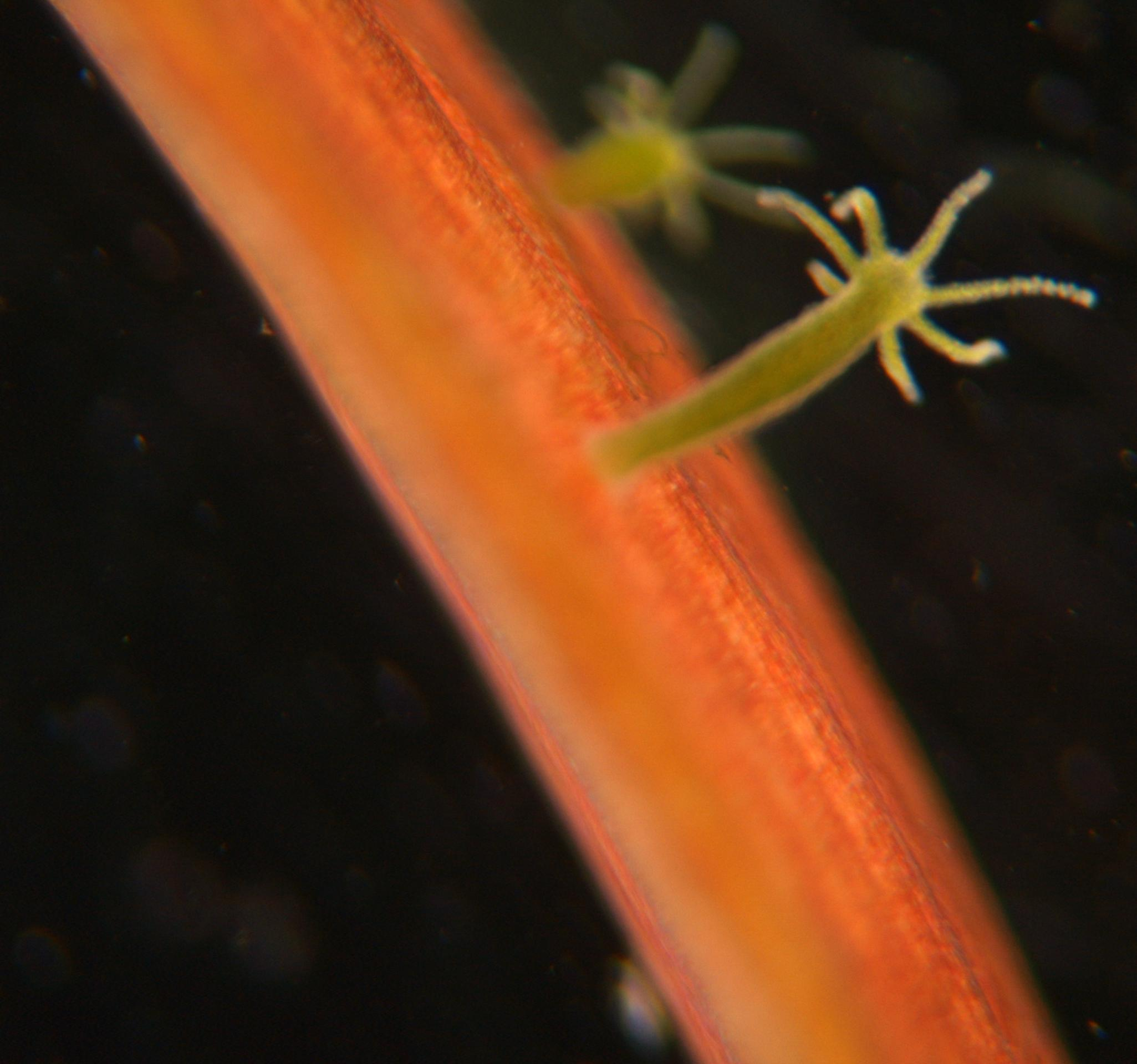
Immortal Hydra, a relative of the jellyfish

Human beings and members of other species, especially animals, age and die. Fungi, too, can age. In contrast, many species can be considered potentially immortal: for example, bacteria fission to produce daughter cells, strawberry plants grow runners to produce clones of themselves, and animals in the genus Hydra have a regenerative ability by which they avoid dying of old age.

Early life forms on Earth, starting at least 3.7 billion years ago, were single-celled organisms. Such organisms (Prokaryotes, Protozoans, algae) multiply by fission into daughter cells; thus single celled organisms have been thought to not age and to be potentially immortal under favourable conditions. However, evidence has been reported that aging leading to death occurs in the single-cell bacterium Escherichia coli, an organism that reproduces by morphologically symmetrical division. Evidence of aging has also been reported for the bacterium Caulobacter crescintus. and the single cell yeast Saccharomyces cerevisiae.

Ageing and mortality of the individual organism became more evident with the evolution of eukaryotic sexual reproduction, which occurred with the emergence of the fungal/animal kingdoms approximately a billion years ago, and the evolution of seed-producing plants 320 million years ago. The sexual organism could henceforth pass on some of its genetic material to produce new individuals and could itself become disposable with respect to the survival of its species. This classic biological idea has however been perturbed recently by the discovery that the bacterium E. coli may split into distinguishable daughter cells, which opens the theoretical possibility of "age classes" among bacteria.

Even within humans and other mortal species, there are cells with the potential for immortality: cancer cells which have lost the ability to die when maintained in a cell culture such as the HeLa cell line, and specific stem cells such as germ cells (producing ova and spermatozoa). In artificial cloning, adult cells can be rejuvenated to embryonic status and then used to grow a new tissue or animal without ageing. Normal human cells however die after about 50 cell divisions in laboratory culture (the Hayflick limit, discovered by Leonard Hayflick in 1961).

== Signs and symptoms ==
Hearing loss with age (presbycusis)
Teenagers begin to lose the ability to hear high-pitched sounds. Beyond the age of 25, many adults cannot hear this 10-second audio clip at a frequency of 17.4 kHz.

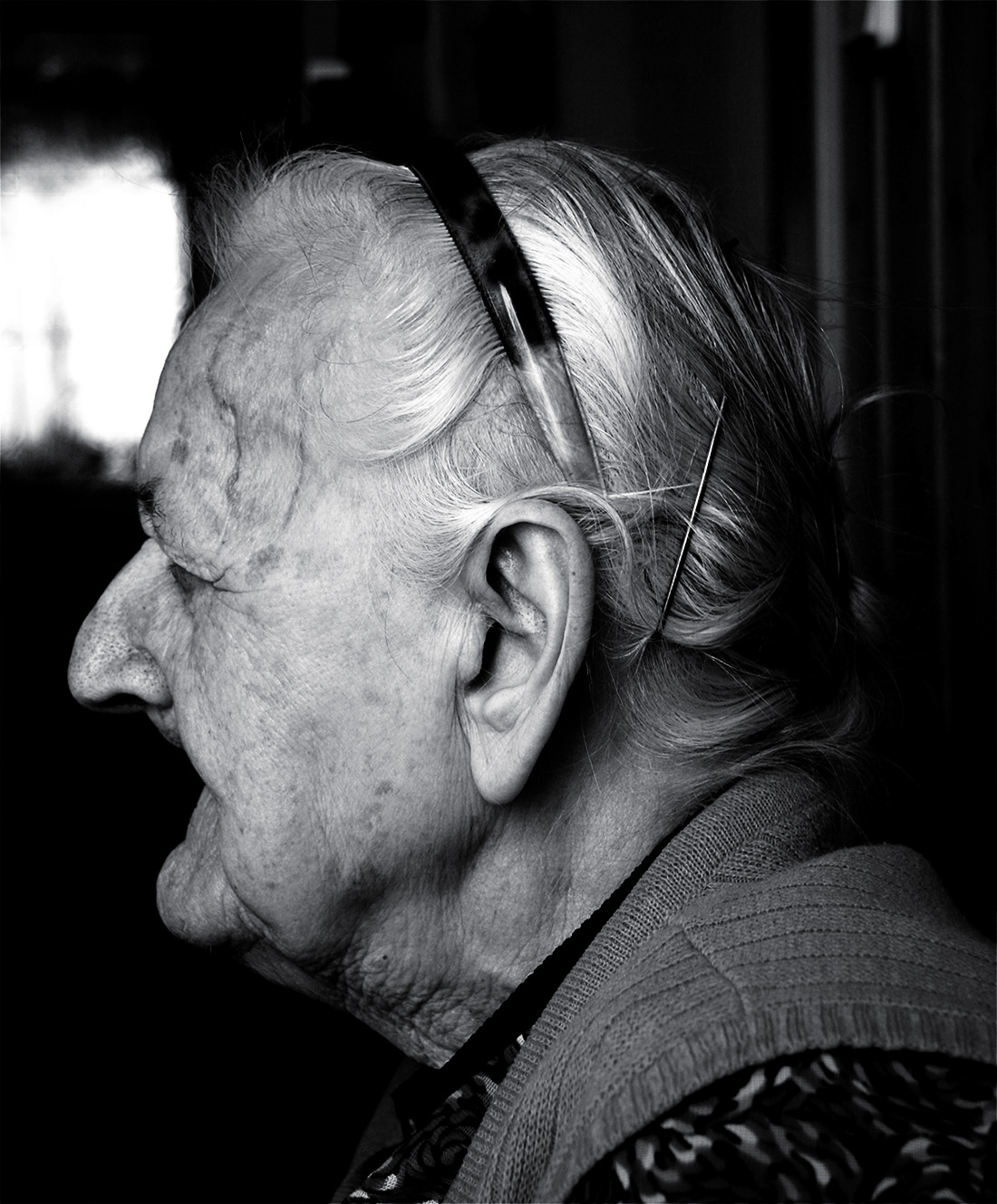
Enlarged ears and noses of old humans are sometimes blamed on continual cartilage growth, but the cause is more probably gravity.

A number of characteristic signs and symptoms of ageing are experienced by a majority, or by a significant proportion of humans during their lifetimes. These age-related changes can vary in different bodily systems and among individuals, a heterogeneity referred to as 'mosaic ageing'.

- Teenagers tend to lose the young child's ability to hear high-frequency sounds above 20 kHz.
- Wrinkles develop mainly due to photoageing, particularly affecting sun-exposed areas such as the face.
- After age 35, female fertility falls rapidly.
- Most people experience presbyopia by age 45–50. The cause is lens hardening by decreasing levels of alpha-crystallin, a process which may be sped up by higher temperatures. An alternative theory is loss of strength in the ciliary muscle of the eyes.
- By age 55, hair tends to grey.
- Pattern hair loss by the age of 55 affects about 30–50% of males and a quarter of females.
- Menopause typically occurs between 44 and 58 years of age.
- In the 60–64 age cohort, the incidence of osteoarthritis rises to 53%. Only 20%, however, report disabling osteoarthritis at this age.
- Constant structural decay, accompanied by progressively lowering osteoblast production, causes bone weakness.
- Almost half of people older than 75 have hearing loss (presbycusis) inhibiting spoken communication. Many vertebrates such as fish, birds and amphibians do not develop presbycusis in old age, as they are able to regenerate their cochlear sensory cells; mammals, including humans, have genetically lost this ability.
- By age 80, more than half of all Americans either have a cataract or have had cataract surgery.
- Frailty, a syndrome of decreased strength, physical activity, physical performance and energy, affects 25% of those over 85. Muscles have a reduced capacity of responding to exercise or injury and loss of muscle mass and strength (sarcopenia) is common. Maximum oxygen use and maximum heart rate decline. Hand strength and mobility decrease.
- Atherosclerosis is classified as an ageing disease. It leads to cardiovascular disease (for example, stroke and heart attacks), which, globally, is the most common cause of death. Vessel ageing causes vascular remodelling and loss of arterial elasticity, and as a result, causes the stiffness of the vasculature.
- The maximum human lifespan is suggested to be around 115 years. The oldest human recognised by the Guinness Book of Records was Jeanne Calment, who died in 1997 at 122 years of age.

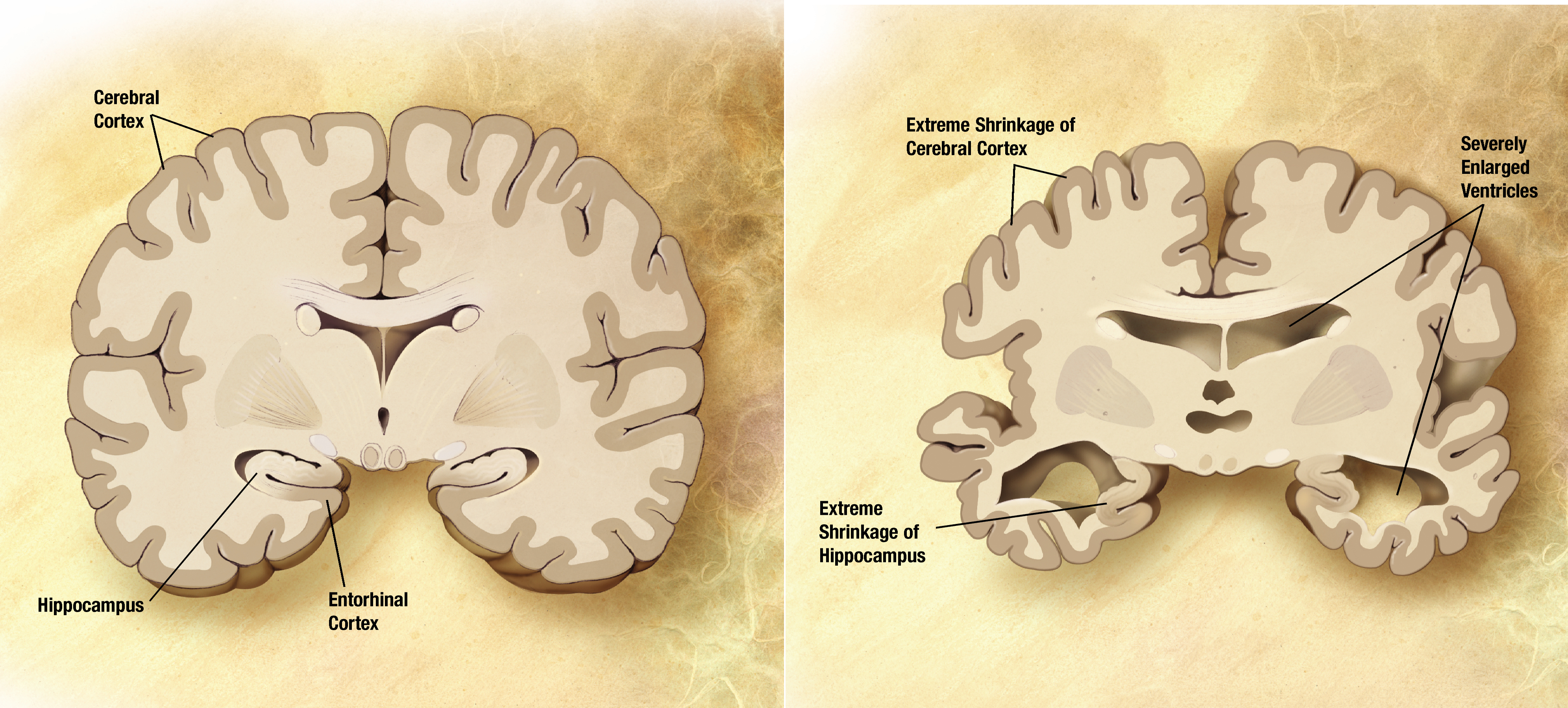
Comparison of a normal aged brain (left) and a brain affected by Alzheimer's disease

Dementia becomes more common with age. About 3% of people between the ages of 65 and 74, 19% of those between 75 and 84, and nearly half of those over 85 years old have dementia. The spectrum ranges from mild cognitive impairment to the neurodegenerative diseases of Alzheimer's disease, cerebrovascular disease, Parkinson's disease and Lou Gehrig's disease. Furthermore, many types of memory decline with ageing, but not semantic memory or general knowledge such as vocabulary definitions. These typically increase or remain steady until late adulthood. Intelligence declines with age, though the rate varies depending on the type and may, in fact, remain steady throughout most of the human lifespan, dropping suddenly only as people near the end of their lives. Individual variations in the rate of cognitive decline may therefore be explained in terms of people having different lengths of life. There are changes to the brain: after 20 years of age, there is a 10% reduction each decade in the total length of the brain's myelinated axons.

Age can result in visual impairment, whereby non-verbal communication is reduced, which can lead to isolation and possible depression. Older adults, however, may not experience depression as much as younger adults, and were paradoxically found to have improved mood, despite declining physical health. Macular degeneration causes vision loss and increases with age, affecting nearly 12% of those above the age of 80. This degeneration is caused by systemic changes in the circulation of waste products and by the growth of abnormal vessels around the retina.

Other visual diseases that often appear with age are cataracts and glaucoma. A cataract occurs when the lens of the eye becomes cloudy, making vision blurry; it eventually causes blindness if untreated. They develop over time and are seen most often with those that are older. Cataracts can be treated through surgery. Glaucoma is another common visual disease that appears in older adults. Glaucoma is caused by damage to the optic nerve, causing vision loss. Glaucoma usually develops over time, but there are variations to glaucoma, and some have a sudden onset. There are a few procedures for glaucoma, but there is no cure or fix for the damage, once it has occurred. Prevention is the best measure in the case of glaucoma.

A distinction can be made between "proximal ageing" (age-based effects that come about because of factors in the recent past) and "distal ageing" (age-based differences that can be traced to a cause in a person's early life, such as childhood poliomyelitis).

Ageing is among the greatest known risk factors for most human diseases. Of the roughly 150,000 people who die each day across the globe, about two-thirds – 100,000 per day – die from age-related causes. In industrialized nations, the proportion is higher, reaching 90%.

== Biological basis ==
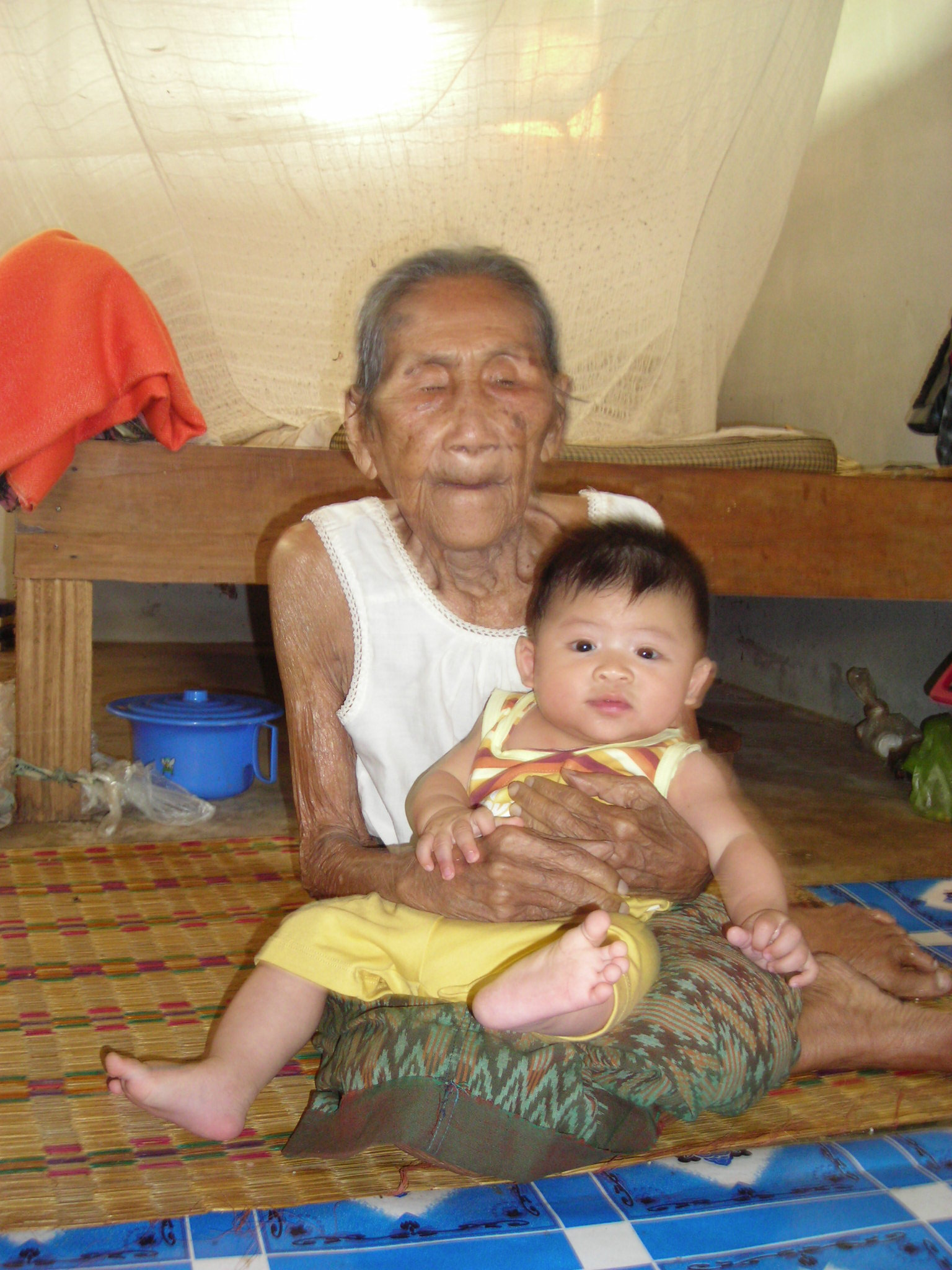
95-year-old woman holding a five-month-old boy

In the 21st century, researchers are only beginning to investigate the biological basis of ageing even in relatively simple and short-lived organisms, such as yeast. Little is known of mammalian ageing, in part due to the much longer lives of even small mammals, such as the mouse (around 3 years). A model organism for the study of ageing is the nematode C. elegans – having a short lifespan of 2–3 weeks – enabling genetic manipulations or suppression of gene activity with RNA interference, and other factors. Most known mutations and RNA interference targets that extend lifespan were first discovered in C. elegans.

The factors proposed to influence biological ageing fall into two main categories, programmed and error-related. Programmed factors follow a biological timetable that might be a continuation of inherent mechanisms that regulate childhood growth and development. This regulation would depend on changes in gene expression that affect the systems responsible for maintenance, repair and defence responses. Factors causing errors or damage include internal and environmental events that induce cumulative deterioration in one or more organs.

=== Programmed factors ===
The rate of ageing varies substantially across different species, and this, to a large extent, is genetically based. For example, numerous perennial plants ranging from strawberries and potatoes to willow trees typically produce clones of themselves by vegetative reproduction and are thus potentially immortal, while annual plants such as wheat and watermelons die each year and reproduce by sexual reproduction. In 2008 it was discovered that inactivation of only two genes in the annual plant Arabidopsis thaliana leads to its conversion into a potentially immortal perennial plant. The oldest animals known so far are 15,000-year-old Antarctic sponges, which can reproduce both sexually and clonally.

Clonal immortality apart, there are certain species whose individual lifespans stand out among Earth's life-forms, including the bristlecone pine at 5062 years or 5067 years, invertebrates like the hard clam (known as quahog in New England) at 508 years, the Greenland shark at 400 years, various deep-sea tube worms at over 300 years, fish like the sturgeon and the rockfish, and the sea anemone and lobster. Such organisms are sometimes said to exhibit negligible senescence. The genetic aspect has also been demonstrated in studies of human centenarians.

=== Midlife acceleration ===
A 2025 study published in Cell examined protein changes in 516 tissue samples collected from 76 human donors ranging in age from 14 to 68. Researchers developed tissue-specific "proteomic clocks" to trace how ageing progresses across different organs. Their analysis revealed a noticeable shift in the rate of ageing around age 50, with the steepest changes occurring between ages 45 and 55—particularly in blood vessels.

Among the various tissues studied, the aorta showed the most significant changes in protein makeup. One of the proteins identified, GAS6, was linked to faster ageing; when introduced into mice, it triggered early vascular deterioration and other signs of systemic ageing. The research also found that some organs, like the adrenal gland, begin showing ageing-related changes as early as age 30, suggesting that not all parts of the body age at the same pace. The findings suggest that human ageing accelerates midlife rather than progressing steadily throughout adulthood. Understanding this shift could help guide earlier and more targeted approaches to support healthier ageing

=== Evolution of ageing ===
Life span, like other phenotypes, is selected for in evolution. Traits that benefit early survival and reproduction will be selected for even if they contribute to an earlier death. Such a genetic effect is called the antagonistic pleiotropy effect when referring to a gene (pleiotropy signifying the gene has a double function – enabling reproduction at a young age but costing the organism life expectancy in old age) and is called the disposable soma effect when referring to an entire genetic programme (the organism diverting limited resources from maintenance to reproduction). The biological mechanisms which regulate lifespan probably evolved with the first multicellular organisms more than a billion years ago. However, even single-celled organisms such as yeast have been used as models in ageing; hence, ageing has its biological roots much earlier than multi-cellularity.

=== Damage-related factors ===
- DNA damage theory of ageing: DNA damage is thought to be the common basis of both cancer and ageing, and it has been argued that intrinsic causes of DNA damage are the most important causes of ageing. Genetic damage (aberrant structural alterations of the DNA), mutations (changes in the DNA sequence), and epimutations (methylation of gene promoter regions or alterations of the DNA scaffolding which regulate gene expression), can cause abnormal gene expression. DNA damage causes the cells to stop dividing or induces apoptosis, often affecting stem cell pools and therefore hindering regeneration. However, lifelong studies of mice suggest that most mutations happen during embryonic and childhood development, when cells divide often, as each cell division is a chance for errors in DNA replication. A meta analysis study of 36 studies with 4,676 participants showed an association between age and DNA damage in humans. In the human hematopoietic stem cell compartment DNA damage accumulates with age. In healthy humans after 50 years of age, chronological age shows a linear association with DNA damage accumulation in blood mononuclear cells. Genome-wide profiles of DNA damage can be used as highly accurate predictors of mammalian age.
- Genetic instability: Dogs annually lose approximately 3.3% of the DNA in their heart muscle cells while humans lose approximately 0.6% of their heart muscle DNA each year. These numbers are close to the ratio of the maximum longevities of the two species (120 years vs. 20 years, a 6/1 ratio). The comparative percentage is also similar between the dog and human for yearly DNA loss in the brain and lymphocytes. As stated by lead author, Bernard L. Strehler, "... genetic damage (particularly gene loss) is almost certainly (or probably the) central cause of ageing."
- Accumulation of waste:
  - A buildup of waste products in cells presumably interferes with metabolism. For example, a waste product called lipofuscin is formed by a complex reaction in cells that binds fat to proteins. Lipofuscin may accumulate in the cells as small granules during ageing.
  - The hallmark of ageing yeast cells appears to be overproduction of certain proteins.
  - Autophagy induction can enhance clearance of toxic intracellular waste associated with neurodegenerative diseases and has been comprehensively demonstrated to improve lifespan in yeast, worms, flies, rodents and primates. The situation, however, has been complicated by the identification that autophagy up-regulation can also occur during ageing.
- Wear-and-tear theory: The general idea that changes associated with ageing are the result of chance damage that accumulates over time.
- Accumulation of errors: The idea that ageing results from chance events that escape proofreading mechanisms, which gradually damages the genetic code.
- Heterochromatin loss, model of ageing.
- Cross-linkage: The idea that ageing results from accumulation of cross-linked compounds that interfere with normal cell function.
- Studies of mtDNA mutator mice have shown that increased levels of somatic mtDNA mutations directly can cause a variety of ageing phenotypes. The authors propose that mtDNA mutations lead to respiratory-chain-deficient cells and thence to apoptosis and cell loss. They cast doubt experimentally however on the common assumption that mitochondrial mutations and dysfunction lead to increased generation of reactive oxygen species (ROS).
- Free-radical theory: Damage by free radicals, or more generally reactive oxygen species or oxidative stress, create damage that may give rise to the symptoms we recognise as ageing. The effect of calorie restriction may be due to increased formation of free radicals within the mitochondria, causing a secondary induction of increased antioxidant defence capacity.
- Mitochondrial theory of ageing: free radicals produced by mitochondrial activity damage cellular components, leading to ageing.
- DNA oxidation and caloric restriction: Caloric restriction reduces 8-OH-dG DNA damage in organs of ageing rats and mice. Thus, reduction of oxidative DNA damage is associated with a slower rate of ageing and increased lifespan. In a 2021 review article, Vijg stated that "Based on an abundance of evidence, DNA damage is now considered as the single most important driver of the degenerative processes that collectively cause ageing."

== Research ==
=== Diet ===
The Mediterranean diet is credited with lowering the risk of heart disease and early death. The major contributors to mortality risk reduction appear to be a higher consumption of vegetables, fish, fruits, nuts and monounsaturated fatty acids, such as by consuming olive oil.

As of 2021, there is insufficient clinical evidence that calorie restriction or any dietary practice affects the process of ageing.

=== Exercise ===
People who participate in moderate to high levels of physical exercise have a lower mortality rate compared to individuals who are not physically active. The majority of the benefits from exercise are achieved with around 3500 metabolic equivalent (MET) minutes per week. For example, climbing stairs 10 minutes, vacuuming 15 minutes, gardening 20 minutes, running 20 minutes, and walking or bicycling for 25 minutes on a daily basis would together achieve about 3000 MET minutes a week.

Exercise has also been found to be an effective measure to treat declines in neuromuscular function due to age. A meta-analysis found that resistance training with elastic bands or kettlebells provided significant improvements to grip strength, gait speed, and skeletal muscle mass in patients with sarcopenia. Furthermore, another analysis found that the positive effects of resistance exercise on strength, muscle mass, and motor coordination reduce the risk of falls in the elderly, which is a key factor for living a longer and healthier life. In terms of programming, there is no one-size-fits-all approach. General recommendations for improvements to gait speed, strength, and muscle size for reduced fall risk are resistance training programs with two to three 40–60 minute workouts per week, consisting of 1–2 sets of 5–8 repetitions of 2–3 different exercises for each major muscle group, but individual considerations must be taken due to differences in health status, motivation, and accessibility to exercise facilities.

There is also evidence to suggest that exercise of any type may mitigate the degradation of the neuromuscular junction (NMJ) that occurs with age. Current evidence suggests that aerobic exercise causes the most hypertrophy of the NMJ, although resistance training is still somewhat effective. However, further evidence is necessary to identify optimal training protocols for NMJ function and to further understand how exercise affects the mechanisms that cause NMJ degradation.

=== Social factors ===
A meta-analysis showed that loneliness carries a higher mortality risk than smoking.

== Society and culture ==
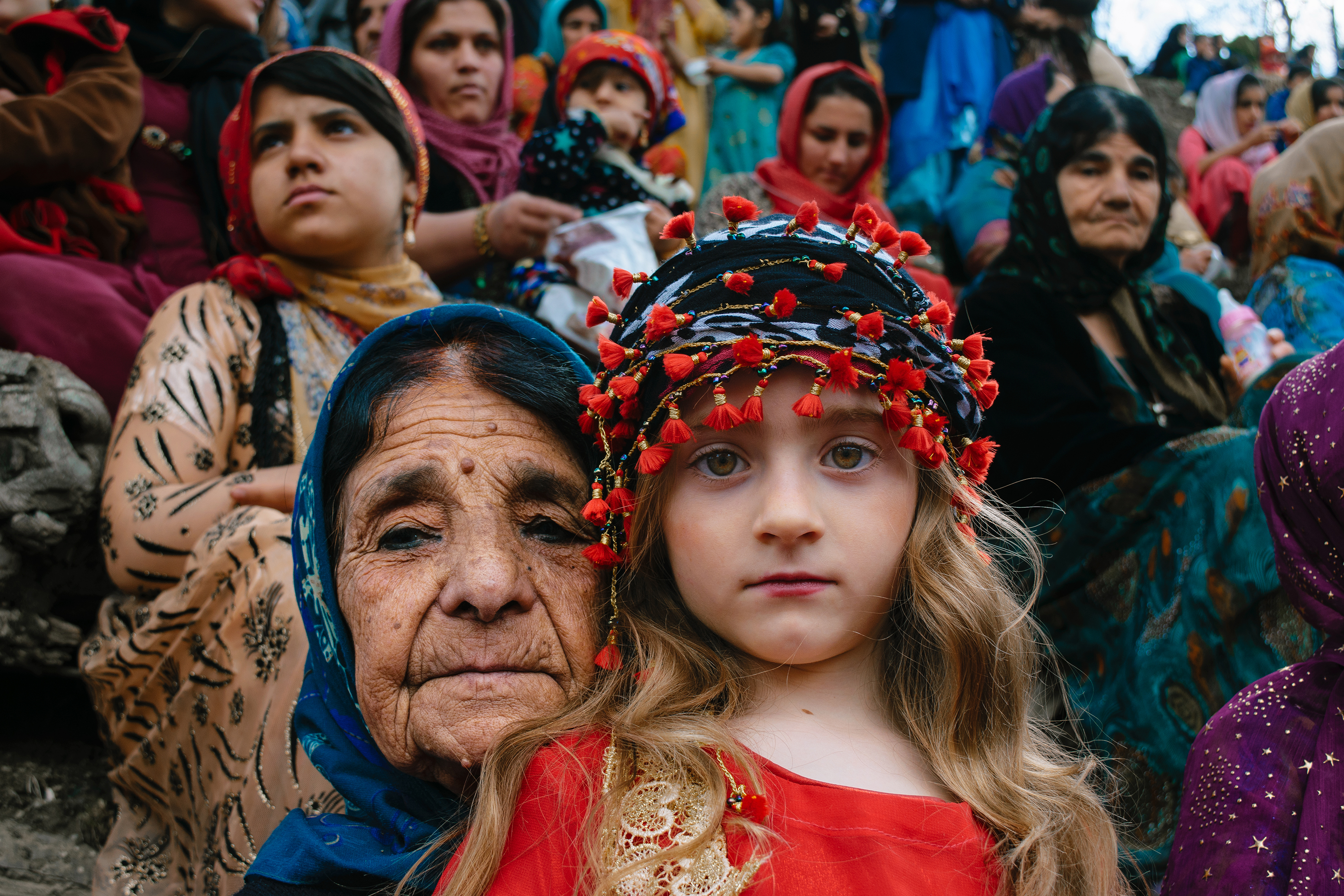
A grandmother and her grandchild

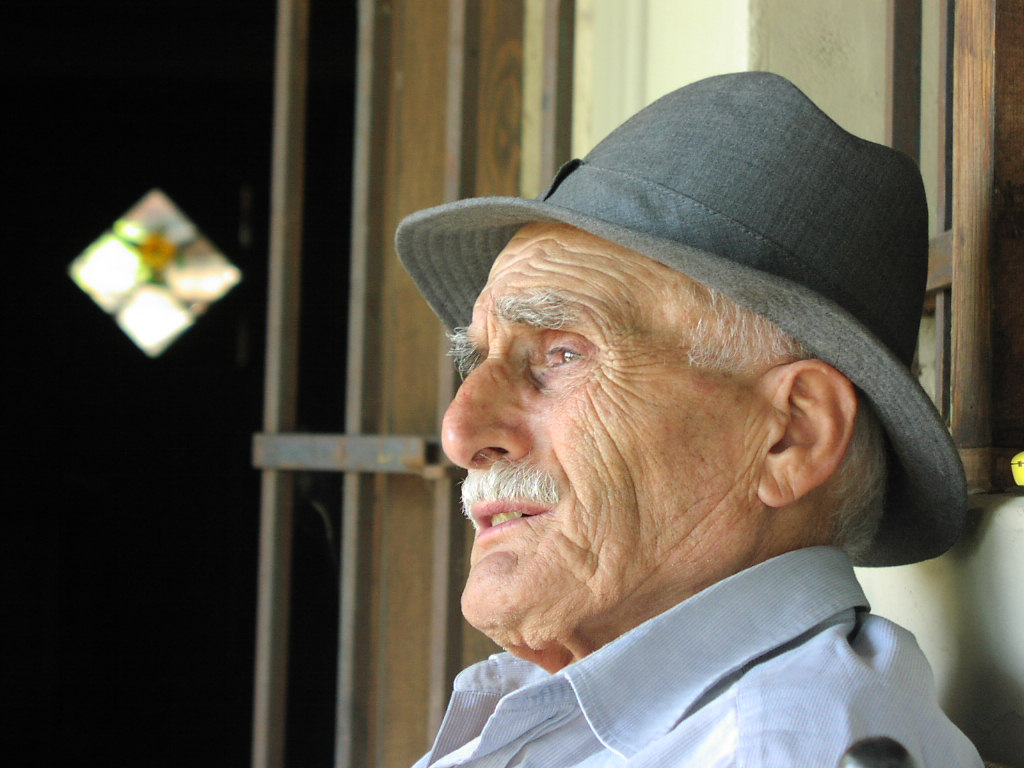
An elderly man

Different cultures express age in different ways. The age of an adult human is commonly measured in whole years since the day of birth. (The most notable exception—East Asian age reckoning—is becoming less common, particularly in official contexts.) Arbitrary divisions set to mark periods of life may include juvenile (from infancy through childhood, preadolescence, and adolescence), early adulthood, middle adulthood, and late adulthood. Informal terms include "tweens", "teenagers", "twentysomething", "thirtysomething", etc. as well as "denarian", "vicenarian", "tricenarian", "quadragenarian", etc.

Most legal systems define a specific age for when an individual is allowed or obliged to do particular activities. These age specifications include voting age, drinking age, age of consent, age of majority, age of criminal responsibility, marriageable age, age of candidacy, and mandatory retirement age. Admission to a movie, for instance, may depend on age according to a motion picture rating system. A bus fare might be discounted for the young or old. Each nation, government, and non-governmental organization has different ways of classifying age. In other words, chronological ageing may be distinguished from "social ageing" (cultural age-expectations of how people should act as they grow older) and "biological ageing" (an organism's physical state as it ages).

Ageism cost the United States $63 billion in one year according to a Yale School of Public Health study. In a UNFPA report about ageing in the 21st century, it highlighted the need to "Develop a new rights-based culture of ageing and a change of mindset and societal attitudes towards ageing and older persons, from welfare recipients to active, contributing members of society". UNFPA said that this "requires, among others, working towards the development of international human rights instruments and their translation into national laws and regulations and affirmative measures that challenge age discrimination and recognise older people as autonomous subjects". Older people's music participation contributes to the maintenance of interpersonal relationships and promoting successful ageing. At the same time, older persons can make contributions to society including caregiving and volunteering. For example, "A study of Bolivian migrants who [had] moved to Spain found that 69% left their children at home, usually with grandparents. In rural China, grandparents care for 38% of children aged under five whose parents have gone to work in cities."

=== Economics ===
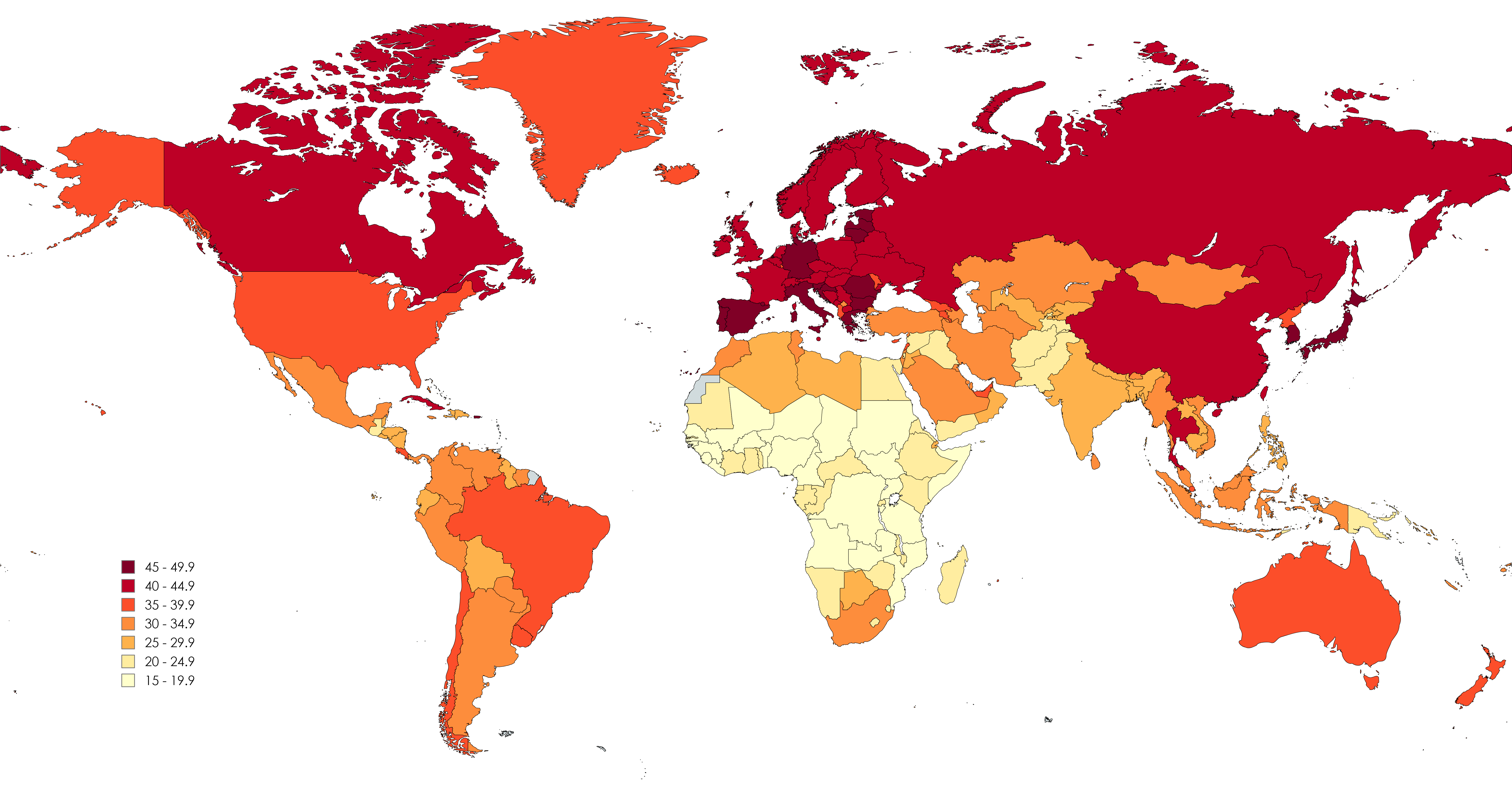
A map showing median age figures for 2024

Population ageing is the increase in the number and proportion of older people in society. Population ageing has three possible causes: migration, longer life expectancy (decreased death rate) and decreased birth rate. Ageing has a significant impact on society. Young people tend to have fewer legal privileges (if they are below the age of majority), they are more likely to push for political and social change, to develop and adopt new technologies, and to need education. Older people have different requirements from society and government, and frequently have differing values as well, such as for property and pension rights.

In the 21st century, one of the most significant population trends is ageing. Currently, over 11% of the world's current population are people aged 60 and older and the United Nations Population Fund (UNFPA) estimates that by 2050 that number will rise to approximately 22%. Ageing has occurred due to development which has enabled better nutrition, sanitation, health care, education and economic well-being. Consequently, fertility rates have continued to decline and life expectancy has risen. Life expectancy at birth is over 80 now in 33 countries. Ageing is a "global phenomenon", that is occurring fastest in developing countries, including those with large youth populations, and poses social and economic challenges to the work which can be overcome with "the right set of policies to equip individuals, families and societies to address these challenges and to reap its benefits".

As life expectancy rises and birth rates decline in developed countries, the median age rises accordingly. According to the United Nations, this process is taking place in nearly every country in the world. A rising median age can have significant social and economic implications, as the workforce gets progressively older and the number of old workers and retirees grows relative to the number of young workers. Older people generally incur more health-related costs than do younger people in the workplace and can also cost more in worker's compensation and pension liabilities. In most developed countries an older workforce is somewhat inevitable. In the United States for instance, the Bureau of Labor Statistics estimates that one in four American workers will be 55 or older by 2020.

Among the most urgent concerns of older persons worldwide is income security. This poses challenges for governments with ageing populations to ensure investments in pension systems continues to provide economic independence and reduce poverty in old age. These challenges vary for developing and developed countries. UNFPA stated that, "Sustainability of these systems is of particular concern, particularly in developed countries, while social protection and old-age pension coverage remain a challenge for developing countries, where a large proportion of the labour force is found in the informal sector."

The global economic crisis has increased financial pressure to ensure economic security and access to health care in old age. To elevate this pressure "social protection floors must be implemented in order to guarantee income security and access to essential health and social services for all older persons and provide a safety net that contributes to the postponement of disability and prevention of impoverishment in old age".

It has been argued that population ageing has undermined economic development and can lead to lower inflation because elderly individuals care especially strongly about the value of their pensions and savings. Evidence suggests that pensions, while making a difference to the well-being of older persons, also benefit entire families especially in times of crisis when there may be a shortage or loss of employment within households. A study by the Australian Government in 2003 estimated that "women between the ages of 65 and 74 years contribute A$16 billion per year in unpaid caregiving and voluntary work. Similarly, men in the same age group contributed A$10 billion per year."

Due to increasing share of the elderly in the population, health care expenditures will continue to grow relative to the economy in coming decades. This has been considered as a negative phenomenon and effective strategies like labour productivity enhancement should be considered to deal with negative consequences of ageing.

=== Sociology ===
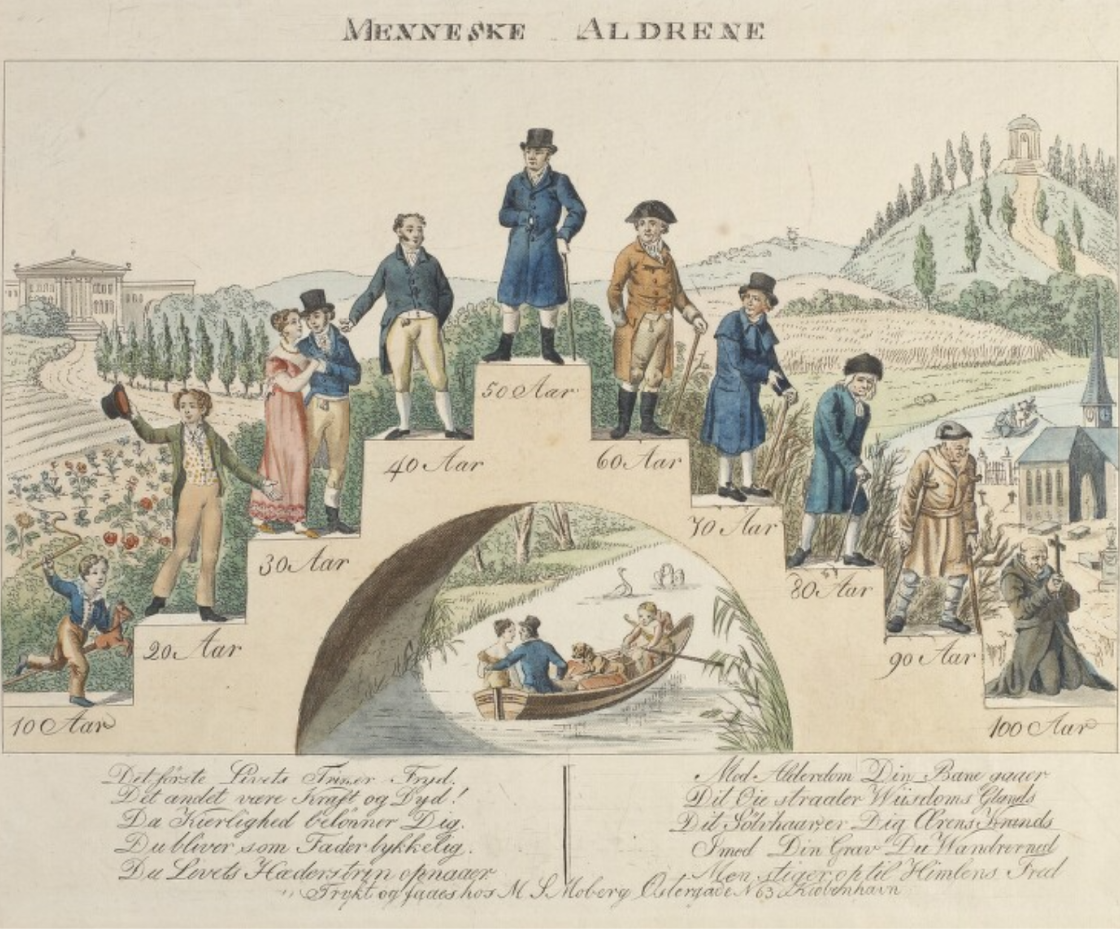
Christoffer Wilhelm Eckersberg: Ages of Man

In the field of sociology and mental health, ageing is seen in five different views: ageing as maturity, ageing as decline, ageing as a life-cycle event, ageing as generation, and ageing as survival. Positive correlates with ageing often include economics, employment, marriage, children, education, and sense of control, as well as many others. The social science of ageing includes disengagement theory, activity theory, selectivity theory, and continuity theory. Retirement, a common transition faced by the elderly, may have both positive and negative consequences. As cyborgs currently are on the rise some theorists argue there is a need to develop new definitions of ageing and for instance a bio-techno-social definition of ageing has been suggested.

There is a current debate as to whether or not the pursuit of longevity and the postponement of senescence are cost-effective health care goals given finite health care resources. Because of the accumulated infirmities of old age, bioethicist Ezekiel Emanuel, opines that the pursuit of longevity via the compression of morbidity hypothesis is a "fantasy" and that human life is not worth living after age 75; longevity then should not be a goal of health care policy. This opinion has been contested by neurosurgeon and medical ethicist Miguel Faria, who states that life can be worthwhile during old age, and that longevity should be pursued in association with the attainment of quality of life. Faria claims that postponement of senescence as well as happiness and wisdom can be attained in old age in a large proportion of those who lead healthy lifestyles and remain intellectually active.

=== Health care demand ===
Health care demand by age (2020, Japan, MHLW)

With age inevitable biological changes occur that increase the risk of illness and disability. UNFPA states that:

"A life-cycle approach to health care – one that starts early, continues through the reproductive years and lasts into old age – is essential for the physical and emotional well-being of older persons, and, indeed, all people. Public policies and programmes should additionally address the needs of older impoverished people who cannot afford health care."

Many societies in Western Europe and Japan have ageing populations. While the effects on society are complex, there is a concern about the impact on health care demand. The large number of suggestions in the literature for specific interventions to cope with the expected increase in demand for long-term care in ageing societies can be organized under four headings: improve system performance; redesign service delivery; support informal caregivers; and shift demographic parameters.

However, the annual growth in national health spending is not mainly due to increasing demand from ageing populations, but rather has been driven by rising incomes, costly new medical technology, a shortage of health care workers and informational asymmetries between providers and patients. A number of health problems become more prevalent as people get older. These include mental health problems as well as physical health problems, especially dementia.

It has been estimated that population ageing only explains 0.2 percentage points of the annual growth rate in medical spending of 4.3% since 1970. In addition, certain reforms to the Medicare system in the United States decreased elderly spending on home health care by 12.5% per year between 1996 and 2000.

=== Self-perception ===
Beauty standards have evolved over time, and as scientific research in cosmeceuticals, cosmetic products seen to have medicinal benefits like anti-ageing creams, has increased, the industry has also expanded; the kinds of products they produce (such as serums and creams) have gradually gained popularity and become a part of many people's personal care routine.

The increase in demand for cosmeceuticals has led scientists to find ingredients for these products in unorthodox places. For example, the secretion of cryptomphalus aspersa (or brown garden snail) has been found to have antioxidant properties, increase skin cell proliferation, and increase extracellular proteins such as collagen and fibronectin (important proteins for cell proliferation). Another substance used to prevent the physical manifestations of ageing is onobotulinumtoxinA, the toxin injected for Botox.

In some cultures, old age is celebrated and honoured. In Korea, for example, a special party called hwangap is held to celebrate and congratulate an individual for turning 60 years old. In China, respect for elderly is often the basis for how a community is organized and has been at the foundation of Chinese culture and morality for thousands of years. Older people are respected for their wisdom and most important decisions have traditionally not been made without consulting them. This is a similar case for most Asian countries such as the Philippines, Thailand, Vietnam, Singapore, etc.

Positive self-perceptions of ageing are associated with better mental and physical health and well-being. Positive self-perception of health has been correlated with higher well-being and reduced mortality among the elderly. Various reasons have been proposed for this association; people who are objectively healthy may naturally rate their health better as than that of their ill counterparts, though this link has been observed even in studies which have controlled for socioeconomic status, psychological functioning and health status. This finding is generally stronger for men than women, though this relationship is not universal across all studies and may only be true in some circumstances.

As people age, subjective health remains relatively stable, even though objective health worsens. In fact, perceived health improves with age when objective health is controlled in the equation. This phenomenon is known as the "paradox of ageing". This may be a result of social comparison; for instance, the older people get, the more they may consider themselves in better health than their same-aged peers. Elderly people often associate their functional and physical decline with the normal ageing process.

One way to help younger people experience what it feels like to be older is through an ageing suit. There are several different kinds of suits including the GERT (named as a reference to gerontology), the R70i exoskeleton, and the AGNES (Age Gain Now Empathy Suit) suits. These suits create the feelings of the effects of ageing by adding extra weight and increased pressure in certain points like the wrists, ankles and other joints. In addition, the various suits have different ways to impair vision and hearing to simulate the loss of these senses. To create the loss of feeling in hands that the elderly experience, special gloves are a part of the uniforms.

Use of these suits may help to increase the amount of empathy felt for the elderly and could be considered particularly useful for those who are either learning about ageing, or those who work with the elderly, such as nurses or care centre staff.

Design is another field that could benefit from the empathy these suits may cause. When designers understand what it feels like to have the impairments of old age, they can better design buildings, packaging, or even tools to help with the simple day-to-day tasks that are more difficult with less dexterity. Designing with the elderly in mind may help to reduce the negative feelings that are associated with the loss of abilities that the elderly face.

=== Healthy ageing ===
The healthy ageing framework, proposed by the World Health Organization operationalizes health as functional ability, which results from the interactions of intrinsic capacity and the environments.

==== Intrinsic capacity ====
Intrinsic capacity is a construct encompassing people's physical and mental abilities which can be drawn upon during ageing. Intrinsic capacity comprises the domains of: cognition, locomotion, vitality/nutrition, psychological and sensory (visual and hearing).

A recent study found four "profiles" or "statuses" of intrinsic capacity among older adults, namely high IC (43% at baseline), low deterioration with impaired locomotion (17%), high deterioration without cognitive impairment (22%) and high deterioration with cognitive impairment (18%). Over half of the study sample remained in the same status at baseline and follow-up (61%). Around one-fourth of participants transitioned from the high IC to the low deterioration status, and only 3% of the participants improved their status. Interestingly, the probability of improvement was observed in the status of high deterioration. Participants in the latent statuses of low and high levels of deterioration had a significantly higher risk of frailty, disability and dementia than their high IC counterparts.

=== Superaging ===
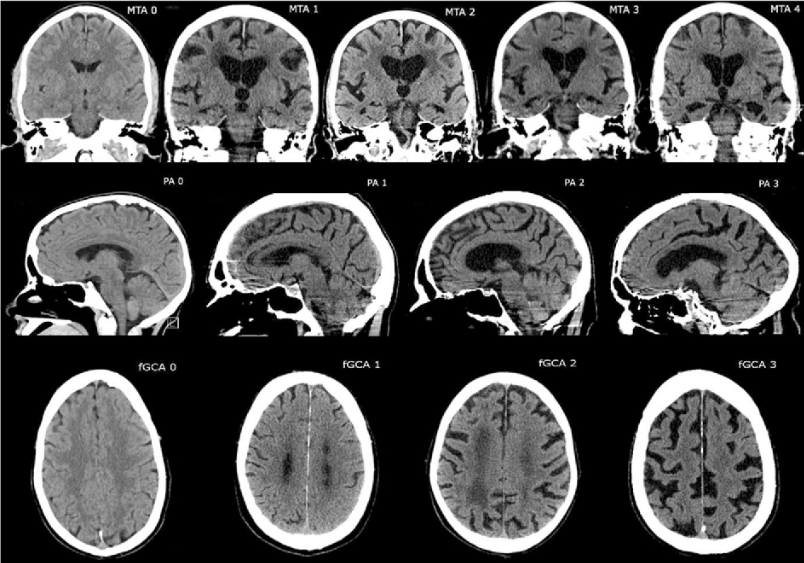
Computer tomographies of medial temporal lobe, posterior atrophy and frontal cortical atrophy. Superagers usually show less cortical atrophy.

A superager (also super-ager) is a person of advanced biological age (80 years or older) who retains the cognitive performance of a much younger person. The term was coined by the neurologist Marsel Mesulam. Individuals of this range of age who show normal performance are called "typical-agers" to differentiate them from superagers.

=== Successful ageing ===
The concept of successful ageing can be traced back to the 1950s and was popularized in the 1980s. Traditional definitions of successful ageing have emphasized absence of physical and cognitive disabilities. In their 1987 article, Rowe and Kahn characterized successful ageing as involving three components: a) freedom from disease and disability, b) high cognitive and physical functioning, and c) social and productive engagement. The study cited previous was also done back in 1987 and therefore, these factors associated with successful ageing have probably been changed. With the current knowledge, scientists started to focus on learning about the effect of spirituality in successful ageing. There are some differences in cultures as to which of these components are the most important. Most often across cultures, social engagement was the most highly rated but depending on the culture the definition of successful ageing changes.

=== Education and ageing ===
Education is considered an important factor in living a long, healthy, and fulfilling life. Research shows that people who spend more years in school often live longer, enjoy better health, and maintain sharper cognitive abilities as they age. Education provides access to more resources, encourages healthy habits, and helps individuals make informed decisions about diet, exercise, and medical care, all of which contribute to improved well-being in later life.

Cognitive scientists also suggest that education strengthens the mind. While some abilities, such as solving unfamiliar problems, may decline with age, other skills—like applying accumulated knowledge and experience—can remain stable or even improve.

== See also ==
- Ageing brain
- Ageing movement control
- Ageing of Europe
- Ageing studies
- Anti-ageing movement
- Biodemography of human longevity
- Biogerontology
- Biological immortality
- Biomarkers of ageing
- Clinical geropsychology
- Death
- DNA damage theory of aging
- Epigenetic clock
- Evolution of ageing
- Genetics of ageing
- Gerontechnology
- Gerontology
- Gerascophobia
- List of life extension-related topics
- Longevity
- Mitochondrial theory of ageing
- Neuroscience of ageing
- Old age
- Old person smell
- Particulates
- Pollutants
- Population ageing
- Progeria
- Rejuvenation
- Neoteny
- Stem cell theory of ageing
- Supercentenarian
- Thermoregulation in humans
- Transgenerational design

== Prevention ==
A 2014 review of healthy diets cites estimates from the World Health Organization and the U.S. Centers for Disease Control that better eating, more physical activity, and not using tobacco could prevent 80 percent of coronary heart disease and type 2 diabetes, and 40 percent of cancers.

The same review cites a public-health estimate that pushing the usual onset of age-related illness in Americans back by seven years would cut the risk of disability and of death at a given age by half.

It also cites work in which steering clear of nine common risks in middle age may raise, by more than four times, the odds of still being healthy in the eighties and nineties.

In North Karelia, Finland, a lifestyle effort that ran for more than thirty years went together with an 80 percent drop in cardiovascular risk, and about three quarters of that drop was explained by cholesterol, blood pressure, and smoking.

During that same Finnish effort, a change in the kind of fat eaten, together with cholesterol intake, explained 65 percent of the fall in cholesterol among men.

A study of 17 major risks, cited in that review, found diet to be the largest cluster, accounting for 26 percent of deaths and 14 percent of disability-adjusted life years lost in the United States.
