= Longevity =

Longer than typical lifespan, especially of humans

Comparison of male and female life expectancy at birth for countries and territories as defined by WHO for 2019. The green dotted line corresponds to equal female and male life expectancy. Open the original svg-image in a separate window and hover over a bubble to see more detailed information. The square of the bubbles is proportional to the country's population based on estimation of the UN.

Longevity may refer to especially long-lived members of a population, whereas life expectancy is defined statistically as the average number of years remaining at a given age. For example, a population's life expectancy at birth is the same as the average age at death for all people born in the same year (in the case of cohorts).

Longevity studies may involve putative methods to extend life. Longevity has been a topic not only for the scientific community but also for writers of travel, science fiction, and utopian novels. The legendary fountain of youth appeared in the work of the Ancient Greek historian Herodotus.

There are difficulties in authenticating the longest human life span, owing to inaccurate or incomplete birth statistics. Fiction, legend, and folklore have proposed or claimed life spans in the past or future vastly longer than those verified by modern standards, and longevity narratives and unverified longevity claims frequently speak of their existence in the present.

== Life expectancy, as of 2010 ==
LEB in OECD countries

Various factors contribute to an individual's longevity. Significant factors in life expectancy include gender, genetics, access to health care, hygiene, diet and nutrition, exercise, lifestyle, and crime rates. Below is a list of life expectancies in different types of countries:

- Developed countries: 77–90 years (e.g. Canada: 81.29 years, 2010 est.)
- Developing countries: 32–80 years (e.g. Mozambique: 41.37 years, 2010 est.)

Population longevities are increasing as life expectancies around the world grow:

- Australia: 80 years in 2002, 81.72 years in 2010
- France: 79.05 years in 2002, 81.09 years in 2010
- Germany: 77.78 years in 2002, 79.41 years in 2010
- Italy: 79.25 years in 2002, 80.33 years in 2010
- Japan: 81.56 years in 2002, 82.84 years in 2010
- Monaco: 79.12 years in 2002, 79.73 years in 2011
- Spain: 79.06 years in 2002, 81.07 years in 2010
- United Kingdom: 80 years in 2002, 81.73 years in 2010
- United States: 77.4 years in 2002, 78.24 years in 2010

== Long-lived individuals ==
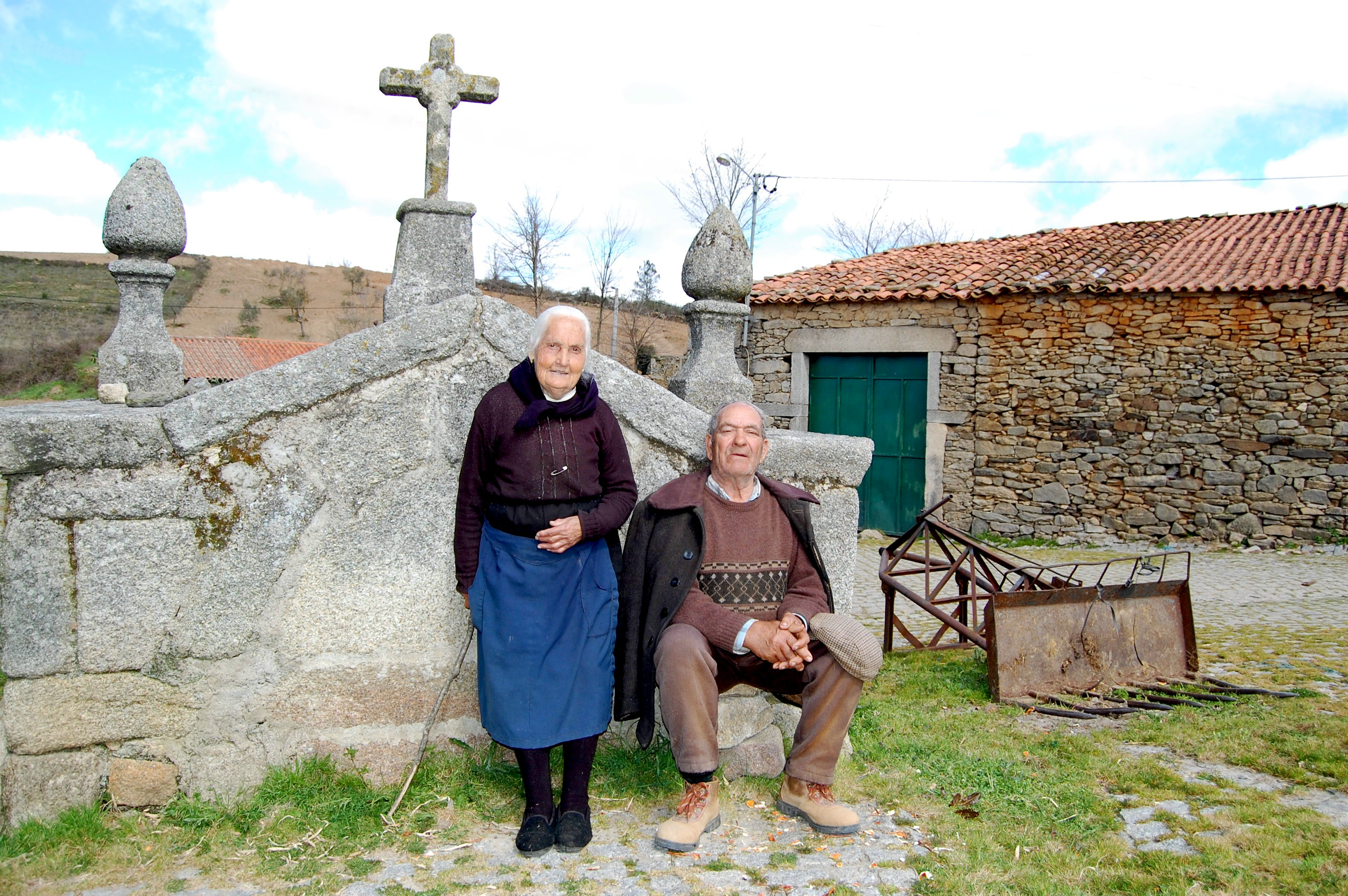
Elderly couple in Portugal

The Gerontology Research Group validates current longevity records by modern standards, and maintains a list of supercentenarians; many other unvalidated longevity claims exist. Record-holding individuals include:

- Eilif Philipsen (21 July 1682 – 20 June 1785, 102 years, 333 days): first person to reach the age of 100 (on 21 July 1782) and whose age could be validated.
- Geert Adriaans Boomgaard (1788–1899, 110 years, 135 days): first person to reach the age of 110 (on September 21, 1898) and whose age could be validated.
- Margaret Ann Neve, (18 May 1792 – 4 April 1903, 110 years, 346 days) the first validated female supercentenarian (on 18 May 1902).
- Jeanne Calment (1875–1997, 122 years, 164 days): the oldest person in history whose age has been verified by modern documentation. (Note: Disputed. In 2018 it was alleged that Calment actually died in 1934, and her daughter Yvonne then usurped her mother's identity. See here for details.) This defines the modern human life span, which is set by the oldest documented individual who ever lived.
- Sarah Knauss (1880–1999, 119 years, 97 days): the third oldest documented person in modern times and the oldest American.
- Jiroemon Kimura (1897–2013, 116 years, 54 days): the oldest man in history whose age has been verified by modern documentation.
- Kane Tanaka (1903–2022, 119 years, 107 days): the second oldest documented person in modern times and the oldest Japanese.

== Major factors ==
Evidence-based studies indicate that longevity is based on two major factors: genetics and lifestyle.

=== Genetics ===
Twin studies have estimated that approximately 20-30% of the variation in human lifespan can be related to genetics, with the rest due to individual behaviors and environmental factors which can be modified. Although over 200 gene variants have been associated with longevity according to a US-Belgian-UK research database of human genetic variants these explain only a small fraction of the heritability.

Lymphoblastoid cell lines established from blood samples of centenarians have significantly higher activity of the DNA repair protein PARP (Poly ADP ribose polymerase) than cell lines from younger (20 to 70 year old) individuals. The lymphocytic cells of centenarians have characteristics typical of cells from young people, both in their capability of priming the mechanism of repair after H_{2}O_{2} sublethal oxidative DNA damage and in their PARP gene expression. These findings suggest that elevated PARP gene expression contributes to the longevity of centenarians, consistent with the DNA damage theory of aging.

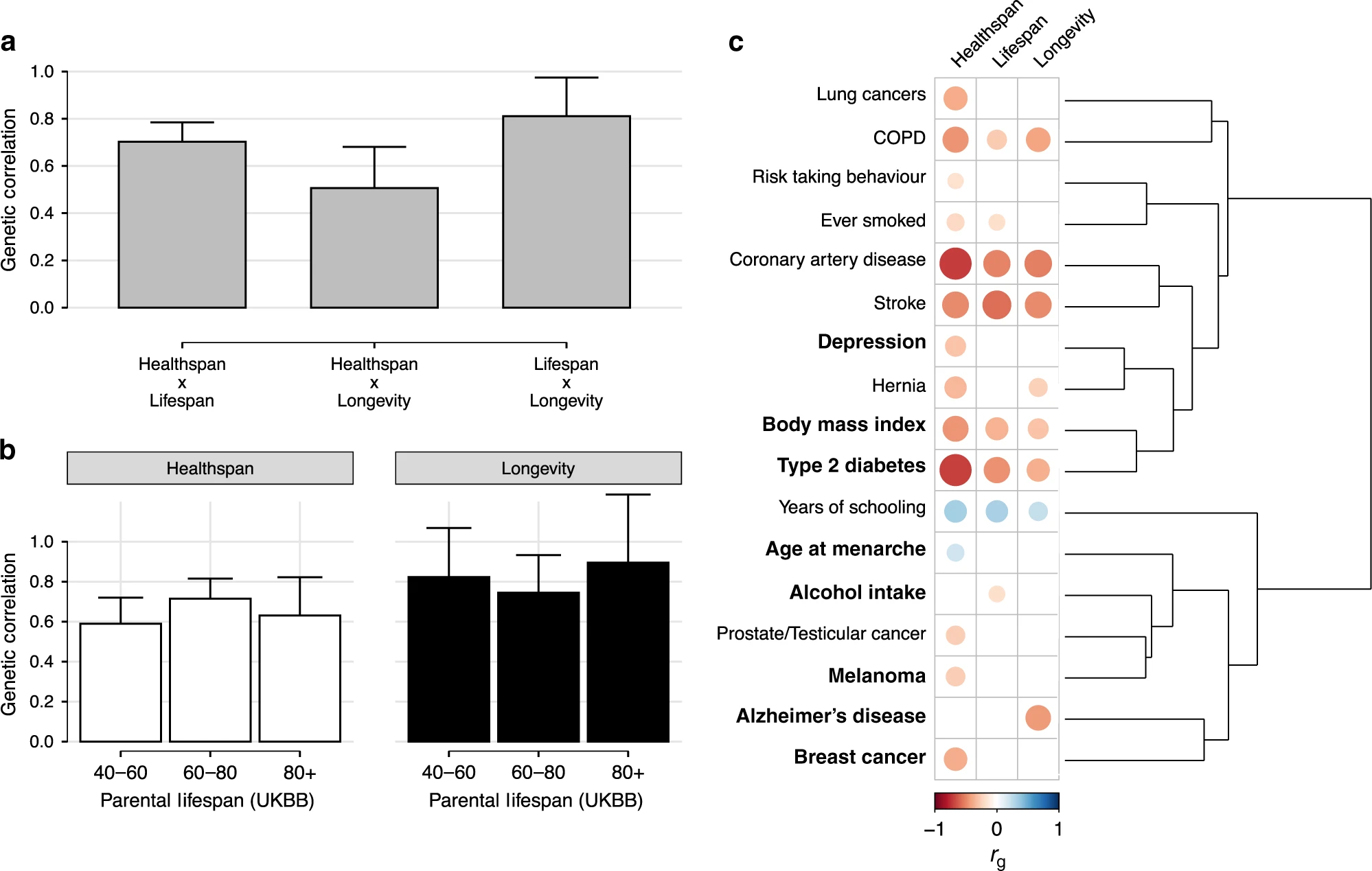
"Healthspan, parental lifespan, and longevity are highly genetically correlated."

In July 2020, scientists used public biological data on 1.75 m people with known lifespans overall and identified 10 genomic loci which appear to intrinsically influence healthspan, lifespan, and longevity – of which half have not been reported previously at genome-wide significance and most being associated with cardiovascular disease – and identified haem metabolism as a promising candidate for further research within the field. Their study suggests that high levels of iron in the blood likely reduce, and genes involved in metabolising iron likely increase healthy years of life in humans.

=== Lifestyle ===
Longevity is a highly plastic trait, and traits that influence its components respond to physical (static) environments and to wide-ranging life-style changes: physical exercise, dietary habits, living conditions, and pharmaceutical as well as nutritional interventions. A 2012 study found that even modest amounts of leisure time physical exercise can extend life expectancy by as much as 4.5 years.

==== Diet ====
As of 2021, there is no clinical evidence that any dietary practice contributes to human longevity. Although health can be influenced by diet, including the type of foods consumed, the amount of calories ingested, and the duration and frequency of fasting periods, there is no good clinical evidence that fasting promotes longevity in humans, as of 2021.

Caloric restriction is a widely researched intervention to assess effects on aging, defined as a sustained reduction in dietary energy intake compared to the energy required for weight maintenance. To ensure metabolic homeostasis, the diet during calorie restriction must provide sufficient energy, micronutrients, and fiber. Some studies on rhesus monkeys showed that restricting calorie intake resulted in lifespan extension, while other animal studies did not detect a significant change. According to preliminary research in humans, there is little evidence that calorie restriction affects lifespan. There is a link between diet and obesity and consequent obesity-associated morbidity.

=== Biological pathways ===
Four well-studied biological pathways that are known to regulate aging, and whose modulation has been shown to influence longevity are Insulin/IGF-1, mechanistic target of rapamycin (mTOR), AMP-activating protein kinase (AMPK), and Sirtuin pathways.

Emerging research suggests that vascular function and microcirculation play an important role in aging and longevity. Endothelial function, which regulates vascular tone, blood flow, and tissue perfusion, is increasingly recognized as an important determinant of cardiovascular and metabolic health.

Hemodynamic forces such as shear stress influence endothelial signaling pathways, including nitric oxide production, which contributes to vascular homeostasis. Impairments in microcirculation and endothelial function have been associated with aging-related diseases and reduced healthspan.

== Change over time ==
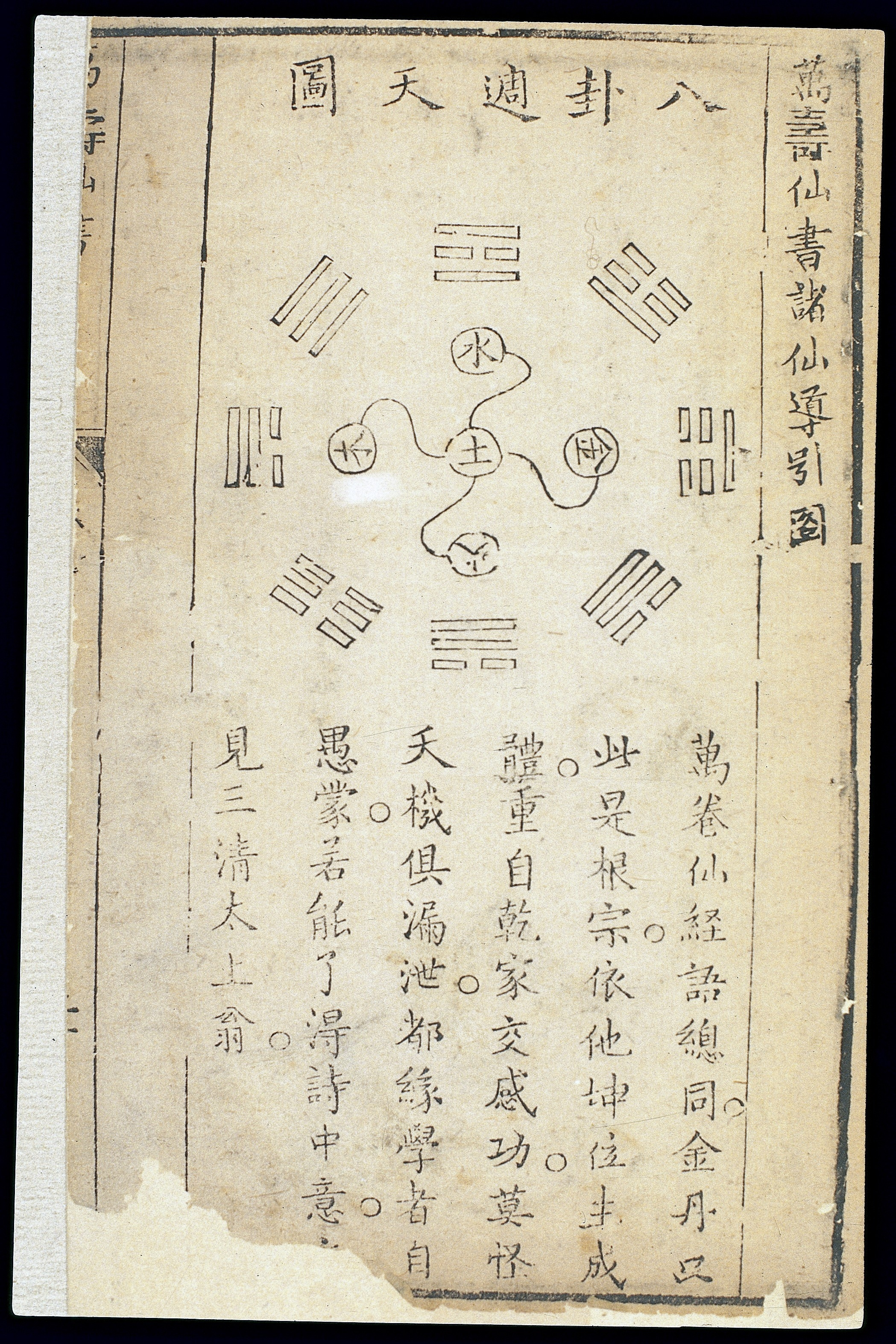
Wanshou xianshu (The Immortals' Book of Longevity), by Wu Weizhen (Ming period, 1368-1644), aims to bring together the cream of longevity techniques from various schools. It juxtaposes text and illustration, and provides information on drugs to be used in conjunction with gymnastic practices.

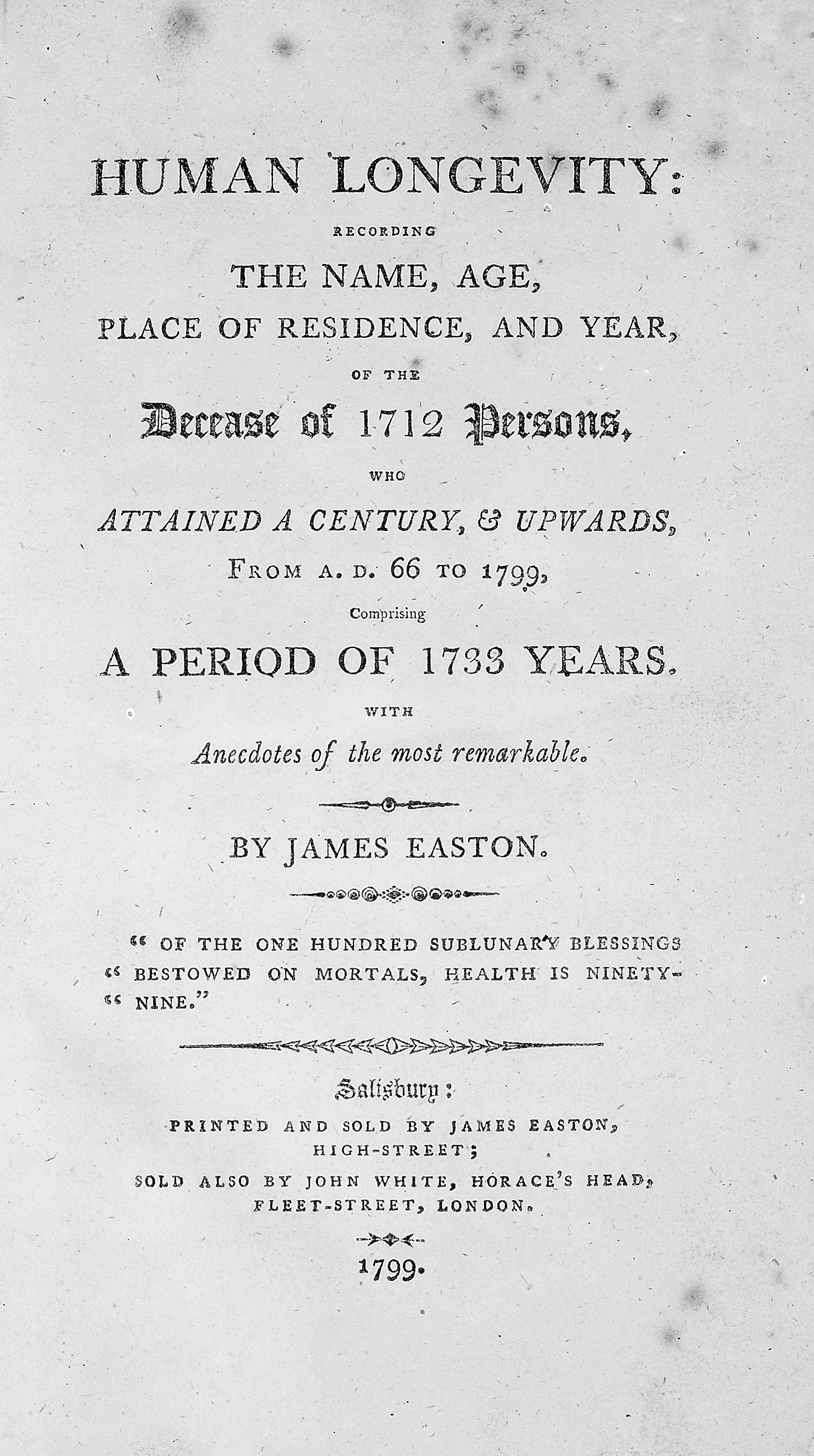
The title page of 'Human Longevity: Recording the name, age, place of residence, and year of the decease of 1712 persons who attained a century and upwards, from A.D. 66 to 1799' by James Easton

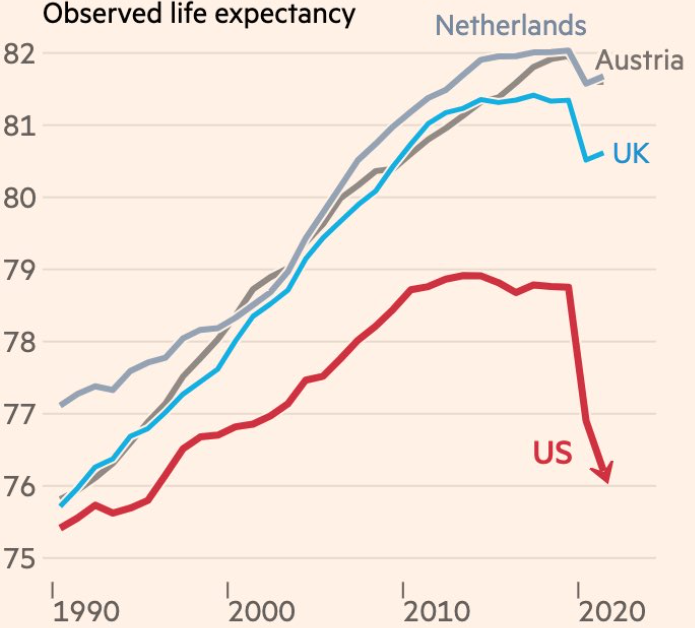
Post-COVID life expectancy in the US, UK, Netherlands, and Austria

In preindustrial times, deaths at young and middle age were more common than they are today. This is not due to genetics, but because of environmental factors such as disease, accidents, and malnutrition, especially since the former were not generally treatable with pre-20th-century medicine. Deaths from childbirth were common for women, and many children did not live past infancy. In addition, most people who did attain old age were likely to die quickly from the above-mentioned untreatable health problems. Despite this, there are several examples of pre-20th-century individuals attaining lifespans of 85 years or greater, including John Adams, Cato the Elder, Thomas Hobbes, Christopher Polhem, and Michelangelo. This was also true for poorer people like peasants or laborers. Genealogists will almost certainly find ancestors living to their 70s, 80s and even 90s several hundred years ago.

For example, an 1871 census in the UK (the first of its kind, but personal data from other censuses dates back to 1841 and numerical data back to 1801) found the average male life expectancy as being 44, but if infant mortality is subtracted, males who lived to adulthood averaged 75 years. The present life expectancy in the UK is 77 years for males and 81 for females, while the United States averages 74 for males and 80 for females.

Studies have shown that black American males have the shortest lifespans of any group of people in the US, averaging only 69 years (Asian-American females average the longest). This reflects overall poorer health and greater prevalence of heart disease, obesity, diabetes, and cancer among black American men.

Women normally outlive men. Theories for this include smaller bodies that place lesser strain on the heart (women have lower rates of cardiovascular disease) and a reduced tendency to engage in physically dangerous activities. Conversely, women are more likely to participate in health-promoting activities. The X chromosome also contains more genes related to the immune system, and women tend to mount a stronger immune response to pathogens than men. However, the idea that men have weaker immune systems due to the supposed immuno-suppressive actions of testosterone is unfounded.

There is debate as to whether the pursuit of longevity is a worthwhile health care goal. Bioethicist Ezekiel Emanuel, who is also one of the architects of ObamaCare, has argued that the pursuit of longevity via the compression of morbidity explanation is a "fantasy" and that longevity past age 75 should not be considered an end in itself. This has been challenged by neurosurgeon Miguel Faria, who states that life can be worthwhile in healthy old age, that the compression of morbidity is a real phenomenon, and that longevity should be pursued in association with quality of life. Faria has discussed how longevity in association with leading healthy lifestyles can lead to the postponement of senescence as well as happiness and wisdom in old age.

== Naturally limited longevity ==
Most biological organisms have a naturally limited longevity due to aging, unlike a rare few that are considered biologically immortal.

Given that different species of animals and plants have different potentials for longevity, the disrepair accumulation theory of aging tries to explain how the potential for longevity of an organism is sometimes positively correlated to its structural complexity. It suggests that while biological complexity increases individual lifespan, it is counteracted in nature since the survivability of the overall species may be hindered when it results in a prolonged development process, which is an evolutionarily vulnerable state.

According to the antagonistic pleiotropy hypothesis, one of the reasons biological immortality is so rare is that certain categories of gene expression that are beneficial in youth become deleterious at an older age.

== Myths and claims ==
Longevity myths are traditions about long-lived people (generally supercentenarians), either as individuals or groups of people, and practices that have been believed to confer longevity, but for which scientific evidence does not support the ages claimed or the reasons for the claims. A comparison and contrast of "longevity in antiquity" (such as the Sumerian King List, the genealogies of Genesis, and the Persian Shahnameh) with "longevity in historical times" (common-era cases through twentieth-century news reports) is elaborated in detail in Lucian Boia's 2004 book Forever Young: A Cultural History of Longevity from Antiquity to the Present and other sources.

After the death of Juan Ponce de León, Gonzalo Fernández de Oviedo y Valdés wrote in Historia General y Natural de las Indias (1535) that Ponce de León was looking for the waters of Bimini to cure his aging. Traditions that have been believed to confer greater human longevity also include alchemy, such as that attributed to Nicolas Flamel. In the modern era, the Okinawa diet has some reputation of linkage to exceptionally high ages.

Longevity claims may be subcategorized into four groups: "In late life, very old people often tend to advance their ages at the rate of about 17 years per decade .... Several celebrated super-centenarians (over 110 years) are believed to have been double lives (father and son, relations with the same names or successive bearers of a title) .... A number of instances have been commercially sponsored, while a fourth category of recent claims are those made for political ends ...." The estimate of 17 years per decade was corroborated by the 1901 and 1911 British censuses. Time magazine considered that, by the Soviet Union, longevity had been elevated to a state-supported "Methuselah cult".

Robert Ripley regularly reported supercentenarian claims in Ripley's Believe It or Not!, usually citing his own reputation as a fact-checker to claim reliability.

== Non-human biological longevity ==
Longevity in other animals can shed light on the determinants of life expectancy in humans, especially when found in related mammals. However, important contributions to longevity research have been made by research in other species, ranging from yeast to flies to worms. In fact, some closely related species of vertebrates can have dramatically different life expectancies, demonstrating that relatively small genetic changes can have a dramatic impact on aging. For instance, Pacific Ocean rockfishes have widely varying lifespans. The species Sebastes minor lives a mere 11 years while its cousin Sebastes aleutianus can live for more than 2 centuries. Similarly, a chameleon, Furcifer labordi, is the current record holder for shortest lifespan among tetrapods, with only 4–5 months to live. By contrast, some of its relatives, such as Furcifer pardalis, have been found to live up to 6 years.

There are studies about aging-related characteristics of and aging in long-lived animals like various turtles and plants like Ginkgo biloba trees. They have identified potentially causal protective traits and suggest many of the species have "slow or [times of] negligible senescence" (or aging). The jellyfish T. dohrnii is biologically immortal and has been studied by comparative genomics.

Honey bees (Apis mellifera) are eusocial insects that display dramatic caste-specific differences in longevity. Queen bees live for an average of 1–2 years, compared to workers who live on average 15–38 days in summer and 150–200 days in winter. Worker honey bees with high amounts of flight experience exhibit increased DNA damage in flight muscle, as measured by elevated 8-Oxo-2'-deoxyguanosine, compared to bees with less flight experience. This increased DNA damage is likely due to an imbalance of pro- and anti-oxidants during flight-associated oxidative stress. Flight induced oxidative DNA damage appears to hasten senescence and reduce longevity in A. mellifera.

=== Examples of long-lived plants and animals ===
==== Currently living ====
- Methuselah: over 4,850-year-old bristlecone pine in the White Mountains of California, the oldest currently living non-clonal tree.

==== Dead ====
- WPN-114, "Prometheus": approximately 4,900 year-old (at time of tree-death) Pinus longaeva, located in Wheeler Peak, Nevada.
- The quahog clam (Arctica islandica) is exceptionally long-lived, with a maximum recorded age of 507 years, the longest of any animal. Other clams of the species have been recorded as living up to 374 years.
- Lamellibrachia luymesi, a deep-sea cold-seep tubeworm, is estimated to reach ages of over 250 years based on a model of its growth rates.
- A bowhead whale killed in a hunt was found to be approximately 211 years old (possibly up to 245 years old), the longest-lived mammal known.
- Possibly 250-million year-old bacteria, Bacillus permians, were revived from stasis after being found in sodium chloride crystals in a cavern in New Mexico.

=== Artificial animal longevity extension ===
Gene editing via CRISPR-Cas9 and other methods have significantly altered lifespans in animals.

== See also ==
- Actuarial science
- Aging
- Blue zone
- Centenarian
  - Supercentenarian
- Genetics of aging
- Life annuity
- Life extension
- Longevity claims
- Longevity myths
- Longevity insurance
- Longevity quotient
- Maximum life span
- Senescence
- Superager
