= Denham Harman =

American biogerontologist

- Born: February 14, 1916; San Francisco, California, U.S.
- Died: November 25, 2014 (aged 98); Omaha, Nebraska, U.S.
- Education: University of California, Berkeley, Stanford University
- Known for: Free radical theory of aging
- Scientific career
- Workplaces: Shell Oil, Emeryville, California; University of Nebraska

Denham Harman (February 14, 1916 – November 25, 2014) was an American medical academic who latterly served as professor emeritus at the University of Nebraska Medical Center. Harman is known as the "father of the free radical theory of aging".

== Background ==
Harman was born in San Francisco and he earned his BS and Ph.D. in 1943 from the College of Chemistry at the University of California, Berkeley and his M.D. from Stanford University, finishing his internship in 1954.

Immediately after earning his Ph.D., in 1943, Harman joined the reaction kinetics department of Shell Oil in Emeryville, California. He worked for six years as a Shell research chemist, in part studying free radical reactions in petroleum products. During that period he was granted 35 patents, one for a compound used in plastic strips to kill flies ("Shell No Pest Strip").

Harman became fascinated with the phenomenon of aging, its cause and possible cure. To assist him in understanding this problem, he went to medical school at Stanford University. Harman became chair of cardiovascular research at the University of Nebraska College of Medicine in 1958.

Harman was married to the same woman for most of his life, a journalism student whom he met at a fraternity dance while at the University of California. The couple had four children and four grandchildren. Harman maintained a healthy lifestyle throughout his life. He never smoked and drank alcohol in moderation. He ran two miles a day until he was 82. He quit because of a back injury, but he continued to take regular walks to help him maintain a weight of 140 pounds on his 5-foot-10 frame.

Harman died in Omaha, Nebraska, on November 25, 2014, from a short illness, aged 98.

== Development of the free radical theory of aging ==
In 1954, between his internship and residency in internal medicine, Harman became a research associate at the Donner Laboratory of Medical Physics at UC Berkeley, where he was able to pursue the puzzle of the cause of aging. After four months of frustration he hit upon the idea of free radicals as cause of the damage to macromolecules known as "aging". Although initially other scientists were reluctant to accept his theory, he was finally able to get it published in what is now a much-cited article in the Journal of Gerontology.

== Mitochondrial theory of aging ==
After years of frustration over his inability to increase maximum lifespan with antioxidant supplements, Harman came to the conclusion that mitochondria were producing as well as being damaged by free radicals, but that exogenous antioxidants don't enter the mitochondria. And that it is mitochondria that determine lifespan. He published his ideas on what he called the "mitochondrial theory of aging" in the April 1972 issue of the Journal of the American Geriatrics Society.

== Organizational accomplishments ==
In 1969 Harman became concerned that few of those involved in gerontology were studying the biological aspects of aging, and fewer still had a serious interest in discovering the cause of aging. In 1970 he became a founder of the American Aging Association (AGE) to create a society of scientists focused on aging research and advocacy of aging research. In 1985 he became a founder of the International Association of Biomedical Gerontology (IABG).
