= Eilif Philipsen =

Norwegian farmer and centenarian (1682–1785)

- Born: 21 July 1682; Kinsarvik, Denmark–Norway
- Died: 20 June 1785 (aged 102 years, 334 days); Kinsarvik, Denmark–Norway
- Occupation: Farmer
- Known for: Oldest known living person (1782–1785); First person verified to have lived to the age of 100

Eilif Philipsen (21 July 1682 – 20 June 1785) was a Norwegian farmer known for his longevity: he was the first accurately documented centenarian ever, and was accordingly the oldest verified living person from 1782 to 1785.

== Biography ==
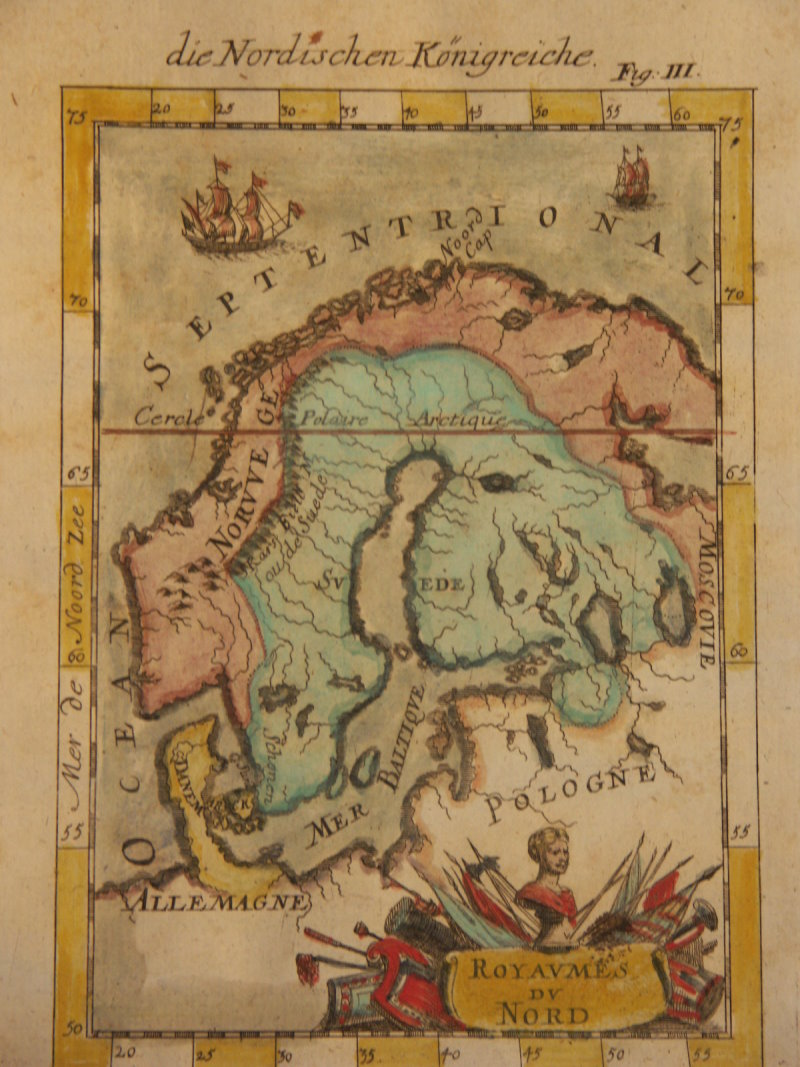
Map of Scandinavia, c. 1700, when Philipsen was a young adult

According to church records, Philipsen was born a twin on 21 July 1682, in the village of Kinsarvik, then a part of the Kingdom of Denmark–Norway. His twin sister went by the name of Ingeborg; they were both baptized the same day they were born. In 1701, when the first Norwegian census had been conducted, he was listed as being of 18 years of age, and living with his father and two brothers—10-year-old Jacob, along with 3-year-old Hans.

In 1721, while nearing 40, he married a 22-year-old. Two years later, he was said to have been involved in a court case. In 1727, he inherited a farm that would eventually be given to the husband of his adopted daughter in 1753. In April 1783, he was mentioned in a local vicar's letter to Bolle Willum Luxdorph. His death was recorded to have taken place in Kinsarvik, his hometown, on 20 June 1785—aged 102 years and 334 days.

== Controversy ==
Although the general consensus is that he is the first securely documented centenarian, there are a few academic scholars who think that there remain doubts. For instance, according to the demographer James Vaupel and the epidemiologist Bernard Jeune, "Philipsen might have been confused with another member of his family bearing the same name", Withington stating that "we do not have enough knowledge about his relatives to rule this possibility out."
