= Neuroscience of aging =

Field of study

The neuroscience of aging is the study of the changes in the nervous system that occur with aging. Aging is associated with many changes in the central nervous system, such as mild atrophy of the cortex, which is considered non-pathological. Aging is also associated with many neurological and neurodegenerative diseases, such as amyotrophic lateral sclerosis, dementia, mild cognitive impairment, Parkinson's disease, and Creutzfeldt–Jakob disease.

== Normal structural and neural changes ==
Neurogenesis occurs very little in adults; it only occurs in the hypothalamus and striatum to a small extent in a process called adult neurogenesis. Environmental enrichment, physical activity and stress (which can stimulate or hinder this process) are key environmental and physiological factors affecting adult neurogenesis. Sensory stimulation, social interactions, and cognitive challenges can describe an enriched environment. Exercising has frequently increased the reproduction of neuronal precursor cells and helped with age-related declines in neurogenesis. The brain volume decreases roughly 5% per decade after forty. It is currently unclear why brain volume decreases with age. However, a few causes may include cell death, decreased cell volume, and changes in synaptic structure. The changes in brain volume are heterogeneous across regions, with the prefrontal cortex receiving the most significant reduction in volume, followed in order by the striatum, the temporal lobe, the cerebellar vermis, the cerebellar hemispheres, and the hippocampus. However, one review found that the amygdala and ventromedial prefrontal cortex remained relatively free of atrophy, consistent with the finding of emotional stability occurring with non-pathological aging. Enlargement of the ventricles, sulci and fissures is common in non-pathological aging.

Changes may also be associated with neuroplasticity, synaptic functionality and voltage-gated calcium channels. Increased hyperpolarization, possibly due to dysfunctional calcium regulation, decreases neuron firing rate and plasticity. This effect is particularly pronounced in the hippocampus of aged animals and may be an important contributor to age-associated memory deficits. The hyperpolarization of a neuron can be divided into three stages: fast, medium, and slow hyperpolarization. In aged neurons, the medium and slow hyperpolarization phases involve the prolonged opening of calcium-dependent potassium channels. The prolonging of this phase has been hypothesized to result from deregulated calcium and hypoactivity of cholinergic, dopaminergic, serotonergic and glutaminergic pathways.

== Normal functional changes ==
Episodic memory (remembering specific events) declines gradually from middle age, while semantic memory (general knowledge and facts) increases into early old age and then declines thereafter. Older adults can exhibit reduced activity in specific brain regions during cognitive tasks, particularly in medial temporal areas related to memory processing. On the other hand, overrecruitment of other brain areas, mainly in the prefrontal cortex, can be engaged in memory-related tasks. Older adults also tend to engage their prefrontal cortex more often during working memory tasks, possibly to compensate for executive functions. Further impairments of cognitive function associated with aging include decreased processing speed and inability to focus. A model proposed to account for altered activation posits that decreased neural efficiency driven by amyloid plaques and decreased dopamine functionality lead to compensatory activation. Decreased processing of negative stimuli, as opposed to positive stimuli, appears in aging and becomes significant enough to detect even with autonomic nervous responses to emotionally charged stimuli. Aging is also associated with decreased plantar reflex and Achilles reflex response. Nerve conductance also decreases during normal aging.

=== DNA damage ===
DNA damage is a major risk factor in neurodegenerative diseases and in the decline of neuronal function with age. Certain genes of the human frontal cortex display reduced transcriptional expression after age 40, especially after age 70. In particular, genes with central roles in synaptic plasticity display reduced expression with age. The promoters of genes with reduced expression in the cortex of older individuals have a marked increase in DNA damage, likely oxidative DNA damage.

== Pathological changes ==
Roughly 20% of persons greater than 60 years of age have a neurological disorder, with episodic disorders being the most common, followed by extrapyramidal movement disorders and nerve disorders. Diseases commonly associated with old age include

- Multiple system atrophy
- Parkinson's disease
- Alzheimer's disease
- Stroke.
- Amyotrophic lateral sclerosis
- Creutzfeldt–Jakob disease
- Frontotemporal Dementia
- Dementia with Lewy bodies
- Corticobasal Degeneration
- Transient ischemic attack
- Vascular dementia

The misfolding of proteins is a common component of the proposed pathophysiology of many aging-related diseases. However, there is insufficient evidence to prove this. For example, the tau hypothesis for Alzheimer's proposes that tau protein accumulation results in the breakdown of neuron cytoskeletons, leading to Alzheimer's. Another proposed mechanism for Alzheimer's is related to the accumulation of amyloid beta in a similar mechanism to the prion propagation of Creutzfeldt-Jakob disease. Until a recent study, tau proteins were believed to be the precedents for Alzheimer's but in a combination of amyloid beta. Similarly, the protein alpha-synuclein is hypothesized to accumulate in Parkinson's and related diseases.

=== Chemo brain ===
Treatments with anticancer chemotherapeutic agents often are toxic to the cells of the brain, leading to memory loss and cognitive dysfunction that can persist long after the period of exposure. This condition, termed chemo brain, appears to be due to DNA damages that cause epigenetic changes in the brain that accelerate the brain aging process.

== Management ==
Treatment of an age-related neurological disease varies from disease to disease. Modifiable risk factors for dementia include diabetes, hypertension, smoking, hyperhomocysteinemia, hypercholesterolemia, and obesity (which are usually associated with many other risk factors for dementia). Paradoxically, drinking and smoking confer protection against Parkinson's disease. It also confers protective benefits to age-related neurological disease in the consumption of coffee or caffeine. Consumption of fruits, fish and vegetables confers protection against dementia, as does a Mediterranean diet. In animal experiments, long-term calorie restriction was found to help reduce oxidative DNA damage. Physical exercise significantly lowers the risk of cognitive decline in old age and is an effective treatment for those with dementia and Parkinson's disease.
