= Compression of morbidity =

The compression of morbidity in public health is a hypothesis put forth by James Fries, professor of medicine at Stanford University School of Medicine. The hypothesis was supported by a 1998 study of 1700 University of Pennsylvania alumni over a period of 20 years.

Fries' hypothesis is that the burden of lifetime illness may be compressed into a shorter period before the time of death, if the age of onset of the first chronic infirmity can be postponed. This hypothesis contrasts to the view that as the age of countries' populations tends to increase over time, they will become increasingly infirm and consume an ever-larger proportion of the national budget in healthcare costs.

Fries posited that if the hypothesis is confirmed, healthcare costs and patient health overall will be improved. In order to confirm this hypothesis, the evidence must show that it is possible to delay the onset of infirmity, and that corresponding increases in longevity will at least be modest. The evidence is at best mixed. Vincent Mor's "The Compression of Morbidity Hypothesis: A Review of Research and Prospects for the Future" argues that "Cross-national evidence for the validity of the compression of morbidity hypothesis originally proposed by Fries is generally accepted. Generational improvements in education and the increased availability of adaptive technologies and even medical treatments that enhance quality of life have facilitated continued independence of older persons in the industrialized world. Whether this trend continues may depend upon the effect of the obesity epidemic on the next generation of older people." See also "Mortality and Morbidity Trends: Is There Compression of Morbidity?" for recent evidence against the hypothesis. There may also be age versus cohort effects.

== See also ==
- Successful aging
