= Free-radical theory of aging =

Free-radical aging theory

The free radical theory of aging, first proposed by American biogerontologist Denham Harman in the 1950s, states that organisms age because cells accumulate free radical damage over time. A free radical is any atom or molecule that has a single unpaired electron in an outer shell. While a few free radicals such as melanin are not chemically reactive, most biologically relevant free radicals are highly reactive. For most biological structures, free radical damage is closely associated with oxidative damage. Antioxidants are reducing agents that limit oxidative damage to biological structures by passivating them from free radicals. In some model organisms, such as yeast and Drosophila, there is evidence that reducing oxidative damage can extend lifespan.

In the 1970s, Harman extended his theory to implicate mitochondrial production of reactive oxygen species. Whether reducing oxidative damage below normal levels counters aging remains an open question. Evidence to the contrary exists in some species. In mice, only 1 of the 18 genetic alterations (SOD-1 deletion) that block antioxidant defences shortened their lifespan. Similarly, in roundworms, blocking the production of a naturally occurring antioxidant has actually been shown to increase their lifespan.

== Background ==
The free radical theory of aging was conceived by Denham Harman in the 1950s, when prevailing scientific opinion held that free radicals were too unstable to exist in biological systems. This was also before anyone had invoked free radicals as a cause of degenerative diseases. Two sources inspired Harman: 1) the rate of living theory, which holds that lifespan is an inverse function of metabolic rate which in turn is proportional to oxygen consumption, and 2) Argentinian biologist Rebeca Gerschman's observation that hyperbaric oxygen toxicity and radiation toxicity could be explained by the same underlying phenomenon: oxygen free radicals. Noting that radiation causes "mutation, cancer and aging", Harman argued that oxygen free radicals produced during normal respiration would cause cumulative damage which would eventually lead to organismal loss of functionality, and ultimately death.

In later years, the free radical theory was expanded to include not only aging per se, but also age-related diseases. Free radical damage within cells has been linked to a range of disorders including cancer, arthritis, atherosclerosis, Alzheimer's disease, and diabetes. There has been some evidence to suggest that free radicals and some reactive nitrogen species (RNS) trigger and increase cell death mechanisms within the body such as apoptosis and in extreme cases necrosis.

In 1972, Harman modified his original theory. In its current form, this theory proposes that reactive oxygen species (ROS) that are produced in the mitochondria, causes damage to certain macromolecules including lipids, proteins and most importantly mitochondrial DNA (mtDNA). This damage then causes mutations which lead to an increase of ROS production and greatly enhance the accumulation of free radicals within cells. This mitochondrial theory has been more widely accepted that it could play a major role in contributing to the aging process.

Since Harman first proposed the free radical theory of aging, there have been continual modifications and extensions to his original theory.

Strictly speaking, the free radical theory is only concerned with free radicals such as superoxide ( O_{2}^{−} ), but it has since been expanded to encompass oxidative damage from other ROS such as hydrogen peroxide (H_{2}O_{2}) or peroxynitrite (OONO^{−}).

== Processes ==
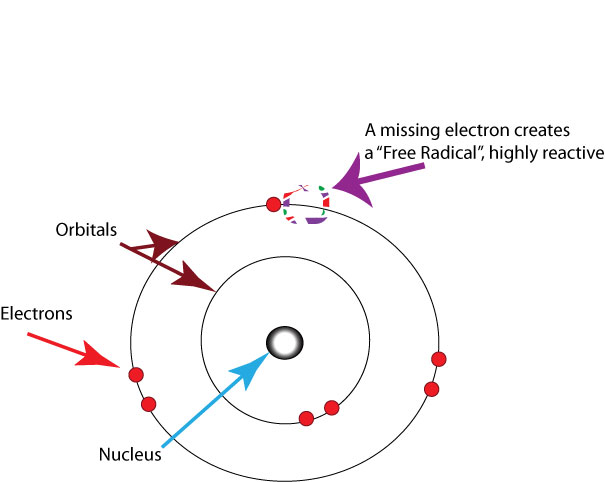
In chemistry, a free radical is any atom, molecule or ion with an unpaired valence electron.

Free radicals are atoms or molecules containing unpaired electrons. Electrons normally exist in pairs in specific orbitals in atoms or molecules. Free radicals, which contain only a single electron in any orbital, are usually unstable toward losing or picking up an extra electron, so that all electrons in the atom or molecule will be paired.

The unpaired electron does not imply charge; free radicals can be positively charged, negatively charged, or neutral. While a few free radicals such as melanin are not chemically reactive, most biologically relevant free radicals are highly reactive.

Damage occurs when the free radical encounters another molecule and seeks to find another electron to pair its unpaired electron. The free radical often pulls an electron off a neighboring molecule, causing the affected molecule to become a free radical itself. The new free radical can then pull an electron off the next molecule, and a chemical chain reaction of radical production occurs. The free radicals produced in such reactions often terminate by removing an electron from a molecule which becomes changed or cannot function without it, especially in biology. Such an event causes damage to the molecule, and thus to the cell that contains it (since the molecule often becomes dysfunctional).

The chain reaction caused by free radicals can lead to cross-linking of atomic structures. In cases where the free radical-induced chain reaction involves base pair molecules in a strand of DNA, the DNA can become cross-linked.

Oxidative free radicals, such as the hydroxyl radical and the superoxide radical, can cause DNA damage which has been proposed to play a key role in the aging of crucial tissues. DNA damage can result in reduced gene expression, cell death and ultimately tissue dysfunction.

DNA cross-linking can in turn lead to various effects of aging, especially cancer. Other cross-linking can occur between fat and protein molecules, which leads to wrinkles. Free radicals can oxidize low-density lipoprotein, and this is a key event in the formation of plaque in arteries, leading to heart disease and stroke. These are examples of how the free-radical theory of aging has been used to neatly explain the origin of many chronic diseases.

Free radicals that are thought to be involved in the process of aging include superoxide and nitric oxide. Specifically, an increase in superoxide affects aging whereas a decrease in nitric oxide formation, or its bioavailability, does the same.

Antioxidants are reducing agents that limit oxidative damage to biological structures by passivating them from free radicals. They help prevent damage from free radical reactions because of their ability to donate electrons which neutralize the radical without forming another. Vitamin C, for example, can lose an electron to a free radical and remain stable itself by passing its unstable electron around the antioxidant molecule.

In some model organisms, such as yeast and Drosophila, there is evidence that reducing oxidative damage can extend lifespan.

== Modifications of the theory ==
One of the main criticisms of the free radical theory of aging is directed at the suggestion that free radicals are responsible for the damage of biomolecules, thus being a major reason for cellular senescence and organismal aging. Several modifications have been proposed to integrate current research into the overall theory.

=== Mitochondria ===
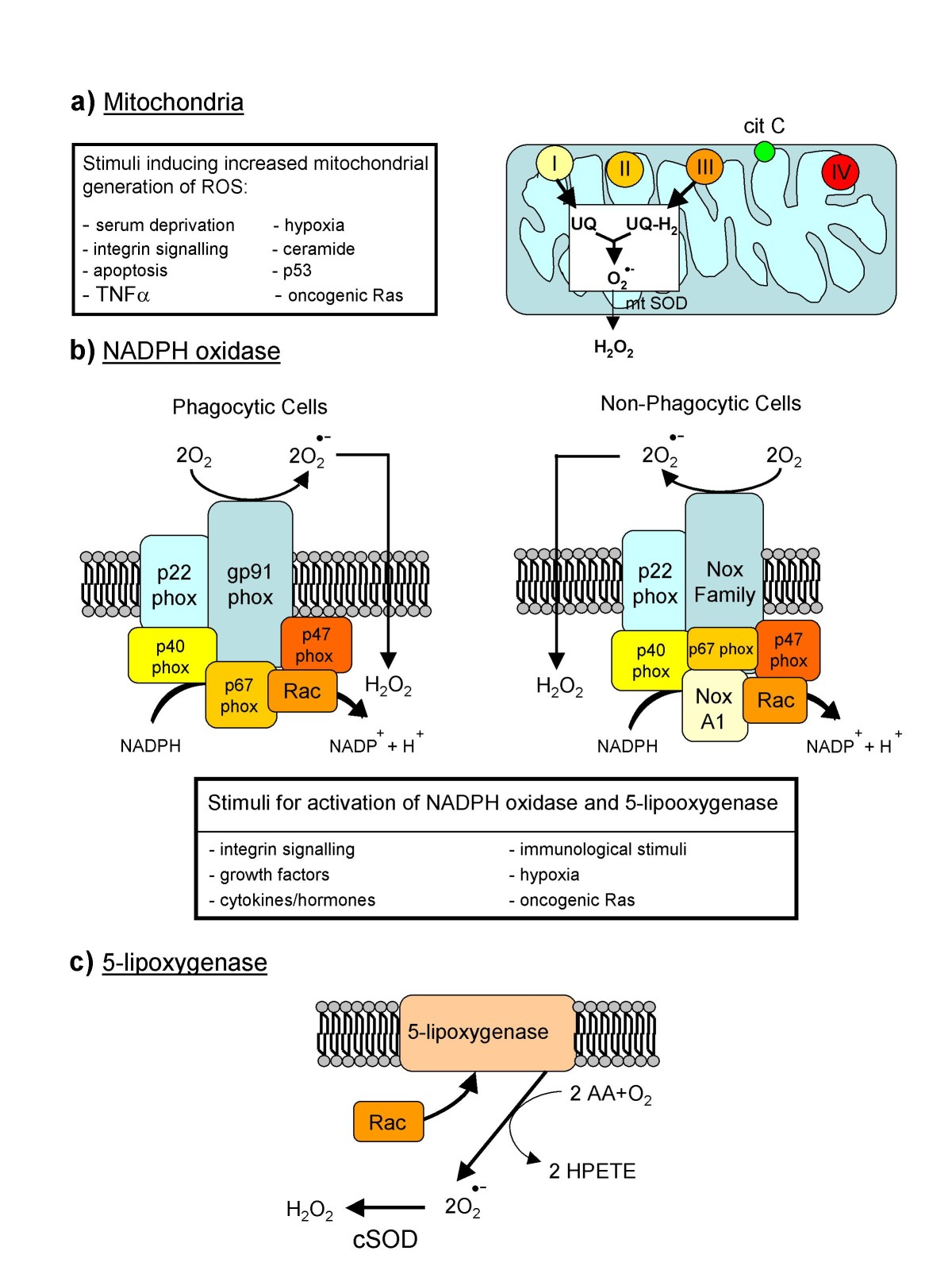
Major sources of reactive oxygen species in living systems

The mitochondrial theory of aging was first proposed in 1978, and two years later, the mitochondrial free-radical theory of aging was introduced. The theory implicates the mitochondria as the chief target of radical damage, since there is a known chemical mechanism by which mitochondria can produce ROS, mitochondrial components such as mtDNA are not as well protected as nuclear DNA, and by studies comparing damage to nuclear and mtDNA that demonstrate higher levels of radical damage on the mitochondrial molecules.

Electrons may escape from metabolic processes in the mitochondria like the electron transport chain, and these electrons may in turn react with water to form ROS such as the superoxide radical, or via an indirect route the hydroxyl radical. These radicals then damage the mitochondria's DNA and proteins, and these damage components in turn are more liable to produce ROS byproducts. Thus a positive feedback loop of oxidative stress is established that, over time, can lead to the deterioration of cells and later organs and the entire body.

This theory has been widely debated and it is still unclear how ROS induced mtDNA mutations develop. Conte et al. suggest iron-substituted zinc fingers may generate free radicals due to the zinc finger proximity to DNA and thus lead to DNA damage.

Afanas'ev suggests the superoxide dismutation activity of CuZnSOD demonstrates an important link between life span and free radicals. The link between CuZnSOD and life span was demonstrated by Perez et al. who indicated mice life span was affected by the deletion of the Sod1 gene which encodes CuZnSOD.

Contrary to the usually observed association between mitochondrial ROS (mtROS) and a decline in longevity, Yee et al. recently observed increased longevity mediated by mtROS signaling in an apoptosis pathway. This serves to support the possibility that observed correlations between ROS damage and aging are not necessarily indicative of the causal involvement of ROS in the aging process but are more likely due to their modulating signal transduction pathways that are part of cellular responses to the aging process.

=== Epigenetic oxidative redox shift ===
Brewer proposed a theory which integrates the free radical theory of aging with the insulin signalling effects in aging. Brewer's theory suggests "sedentary behaviour associated with age triggers an oxidized redox shift and impaired mitochondrial function". This mitochondrial impairment leads to more sedentary behaviour and accelerated aging.

=== Metabolic stability ===
The metabolic stability theory of aging suggests it is the cells ability to maintain stable concentration of ROS which is the primary determinant of lifespan. This theory criticizes the free radical theory because it ignores that ROS are specific signalling molecules which are necessary for maintaining normal cell functions.

=== Mitohormesis ===
Oxidative stress may promote life expectancy of Caenorhabditis elegans by inducing a secondary response to initially increased levels of ROS. In mammals, the question of the net effect of reactive oxygen species on aging is even less clear. Recent epidemiological findings support the process of mitohormesis in humans, and even suggest that the intake of exogenous antioxidants may increase disease prevalence in humans (according to the theory, because they prevent the stimulation of the organism's natural response to the oxidant compounds which not only neutralizes them but provides other benefits as well).

== Challenges ==
=== Birds ===
Among birds, parrots live about five times longer than quail. ROS production in heart, skeletal muscle, liver and intact erythrocytes was found to be similar in parrots and quail and showed no correspondence with longevity difference. These findings were concluded to cast doubt on the robustness of the oxidative stress theory of aging.

=== Other species ===
In mice, only 1 of the 18 genetic alterations (SOD-1 deletion) that block antioxidant defences shortened lifespan. Similarly, in roundworms (Caenorhabditis elegans), blocking the production of the naturally occurring antioxidant superoxide dismutase has been shown to increase lifespan.

== See also ==
- Life extension
- List of life extension-related topics
- Senescence
- Mitochondrial theory of ageing
