= Ageing suit =

Suit simulating the constraints of older aged drivers

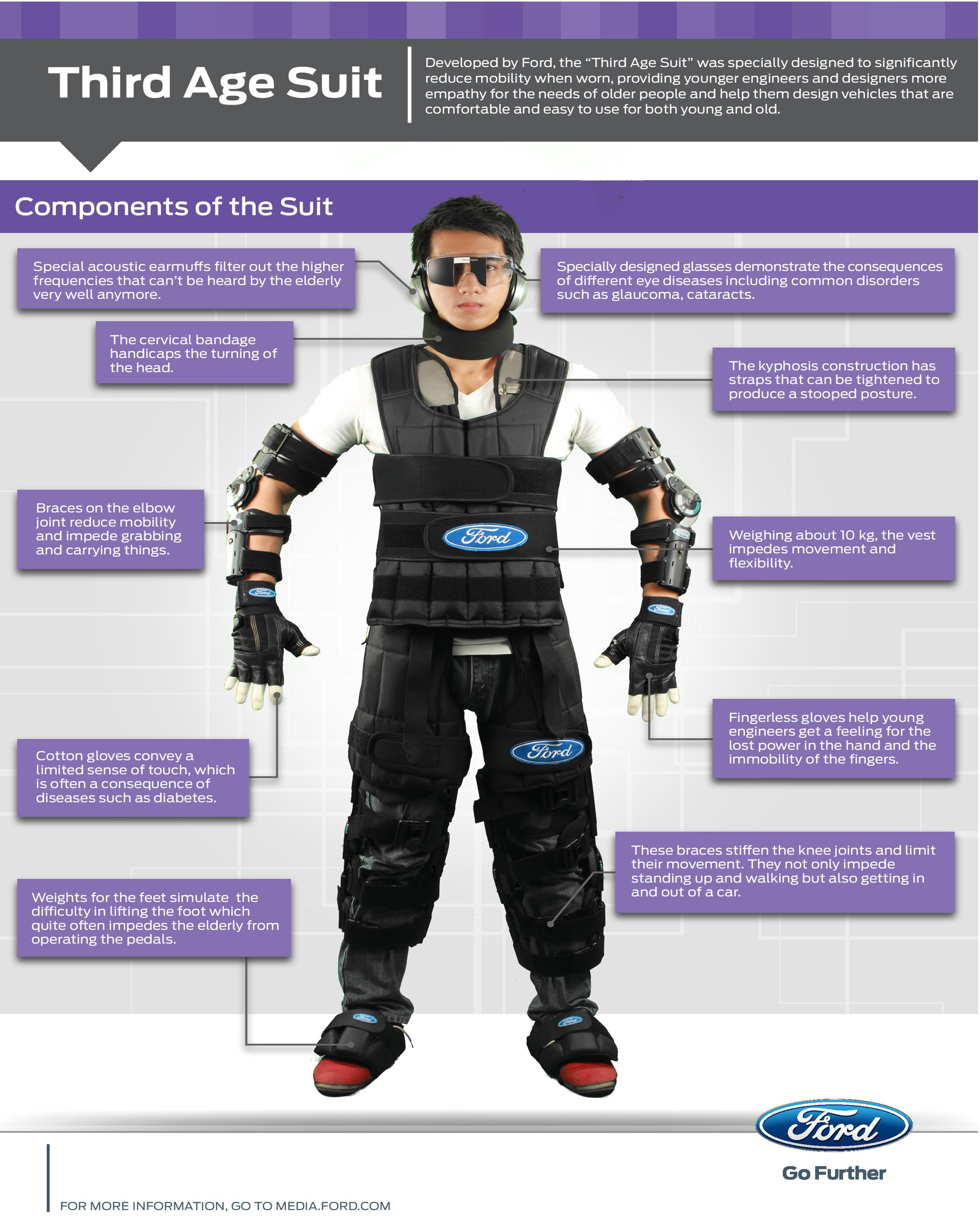
Ford Third Age Suit III (2014)

An ageing suit (also spelt as aging suit) is a suit pioneered by the automotive industry in simulating the constraints of older aged drivers. Ageing suits were first used by Japanese carmaker Nissan in the early 21st Century, since Japan has a large aged population. MIT's ageing suit, nicknamed "AGNES", has been used in research by companies such as Siemens, Daimler, and General Mills. The suits target and enable the study and solving of senior citizenry infirmities such as bad balance, stiff joints, weaker eyesight, and extra weight. According to Nissan's associate chief designer Etsuhiro Watanabe; "Difficulty in walking, back pains, trouble in lifting arms -- we wanted to consider assorted infirmities. It's easy to do this for the young, but we wanted to design for adverse conditions and see what modifications are needed."

Ageing suits are made of materials that restrict movement of the knees, elbows, back, and neck, and use gloves to reduce the sense of touch and goggles to simulate blurry vision. Such suits are also widely used by Ford, and played a major role in the development of their Ford Focus.

In Mexico, the ageing suit was reoriented as a method of gerontological training, by the designer Annika Maya Rivero (Mayores de Hoy) she thinks that more than an aging suit, the suit should be called "Emphatic generator suit"

== See also ==
- Old age
