= Mitochondrial unfolded protein response =

The mitochondrial unfolded protein response (UPR^{mt}) is a cellular stress response related to the mitochondria. The UPR^{mt} results from unfolded or misfolded proteins in mitochondria beyond the capacity of chaperone proteins to handle them. The UPR^{mt} can occur either in the mitochondrial matrix or in the mitochondrial inner membrane. In the UPR^{mt}, the mitochondrion will either upregulate chaperone proteins or invoke proteases to degrade proteins that fail to fold properly. UPR^{mt} causes the sirtuin SIRT3 to activate antioxidant enzymes and mitophagy.

Mitochondrial electron transport chain mutations that extend the life span of Caenorhabditis elegans (nematode worms) also activate the UPR^{mt}. Activation of the UPR^{mt} in nematode worms by increasing NAD+ by supplementation with nicotinamide or nicotinamide riboside has been shown to extend lifespan. Glial and germline mitochondria has been found to play a significant role in the signalling and regulation of UPR^{mt} have been shown to play a central role Nicotinamide riboside supplementation in mice has also been shown to activate the UPR^{mt}.

== Cellular unfolded protein responses ==
A majority of cellular proteins are translated and folded in the cytosol with the help of molecular chaperones. Just as proteins must be folded to function in the cytosol, proteins in organelles like the endoplasmic reticulum (ER) and mitochondria also must be folded to function. Consequently, specific cellular mechanisms exist that aim to detect cellular stress (causing misfolded/unfolded proteins to accumulate), transduce the signal to the nucleus, and mediate the restoration of protein homeostasis (proteostasis). In the cytosol, the heat shock response (HSR) manages the unfolded proteins through heat shock factor 1 (HSF1). HSF-1 is a transcription factor that, upon increases in unfolded cytosolic proteins, will trimerize and enter the nucleus to upregulate the expression of heat shock proteins (HSPs) that will act as protein folding chaperones.

In organelles like the ER and mitochondria, the response is slightly more complex. Both UPR mechanisms are conceptually similar in that they are activated by the accumulation of misfolded/ unfolded proteins and induce the translational upregulation of molecular chaperones and proteases to process proteins and restore homeostasis. Despite their names, the two pathways possess distinct initiating stimuli and signaling mechanisms that regulate the responses. The ER UPR is induced by a variety of cellular stressors that inhibit protein folding or exit of the ER. Within the ER GRP78, an ER lumen chaperone, is bound to ER membrane proteins. When unfolded proteins build up, it dissociates to from the membrane to aid in protein folding. GRP78 dissociation triggers the UPR^{ER} that restores protein homeostasis via three pathways (IRE1, PERK, and ATF6). The UPR^{ER} restores proteostasis by selectively attenuation protein translation, upregulating protein folding chaperones, and degrading excess misfolded proteins via ER associated protein degradation (ERAD). Prolonged activation of the UPR^{ER} can result in apoptosis.

The UPR^{mt} progresses through the bZIP transcription factor ATFS-1 (in C. elegans; ATF5 in mammals). AFTS-1 is usually imported into the mitochondria where it is degraded by the LON protease. Mitochondrial dysfunction inhibits this process and allows ATFS-1 to accumulate in the cytosol and enter the nucleus where it can act as a transcription factor. This responses restores proteostasis by upregulating chaperones and proteases, increasing reactive oxygen species (ROS) detoxification, and increasing mitochondrial import machinery.

== Molecular ==
In mammals, UPR^{mt} has mostly been studied using transfection with a truncated, dysfunctional mitochondrial enzyme (OTCΔ) that does not fold correctly after translocation into the mitochondrial matrix. Using this approach, several components of the mammalian UPR^{mt} have been identified including the mitochondrial chaperone heat shock protein 60 (Hsp60), the mitochondrial caseinolytic peptidase ClpP, the transcription factor Chop and the kinases c-Jun N-terminal kinase (JNK) and the interferon-induced, double-stranded RNA-activated protein kinase (Pkr).

The appropriately named activating transcription factor associated with stress (ATFS-1) is one of the primary transcription factors required for UPR^{mt} activation in worms. ATFS-1 has a nuclear localization sequence that allows it to be imported into the nucleus as well as an N-terminal mitochondrial targeting sequence (MTS) that allows for import into the mitochondria. In healthy cells, ATFS-1 is preferentially targeted to the mitochondrial matrix where it is degraded by the Lon protease. The MTS on ATFS-1 is predicted by Mitofates to be substantially weaker than most MTSs which would allow it to be sensitive to subtle mitochondrial dysfunction. Following mitochondrial stress, ATFS-1 mitochondrial import efficiency is decreased resulting in a cytoplasmic accumulation of ATFS-1. Subsequently, ATFS-1 will enter the nucleus via its nuclear transport signal. In the nucleus, ATFS-1 has a broad transcriptional regulation as it will: attenuate OXPHOS gene expression in both the nucleus and mitochondria, upregulate chaperones and proteases to re-establish mitochondrial proteostasis, increase ROS detoxification, and increase mitochondrial import machinery.

== Relationship to cancer ==
Recent research has implicated the UPR^{mt} in the transformation of cells in to cancer cells. Researchers have identified the SIRT3 axis of UPR^{mt} as a marker to differentiate between metastatic and non-metastatic breast cancer. As many cancers exhibit a metabolic shift from oxidative phosporylation-depentent energy production to aerobic glycolysis dependent energy production, also known as the Warburg effect, researchers suggest that cancer cells rely on the UPR^{mt} to maintain the mitochondrial integrity. Furthermore, multiple studies have shown that inhibition of UPR^{mt}, specifically ATF5, selectively kills human and rat cancer cells rather than non-cancer cells.

== Relationship to inflammatory bowel disease ==
Inflammatory bowel diseases (Crohn´s disease and ulcerative colitis) have been associated with mitochondrial dysfunction in the intestinal epithelium. In mouse models of intestinal inflammation and in IBD patients, signs of UPR^{mt} -activation have been demonstrated. In particular, mitochondrial dysfunction and UPR^{mt} -activation have been linked to intestinal stemness and Paneth cell (dys-)function.

== See also ==
- Unfolded protein response
- Genetics of aging
- Daf-2
- Age-1
