= Dauer larva =

Developmental stage in nematodes

Dauer (German "die Dauer", English "the endurance", "persistence"; "unlimited time") describes an alternative developmental stage of nematode worms, particularly rhabditids including Caenorhabditis elegans, whereby the larva goes into a type of stasis and can survive harsh conditions. Since the entrance of the dauer stage is dependent on environmental cues, it represents a classic and well studied example of polyphenism. The dauer state is given other names in the various types of nematodes such as 'diapause' or 'hypobiosis', but since the C. elegans nematode has become the most studied nematode, the term 'dauer stage' or 'dauer larvae' is becoming universally recognised when referring to this state in other free-living nematodes. The dauer stage is also considered to be equivalent to the infective stage of parasitic nematode larvae.

As Émile Maupas first proposed in 1899 and 1900, all nematodes have five stages separated by four moults. Under environmental conditions that are favorable for reproduction, C. elegans larvae develop through four stages or moults which are designated as L1, L2, L3 and L4. After L4, animals moult to the reproductive adult stage. However, when the environment is unfavorable, L1 and L2 animals have the option to divert their development from reproduction to dauer formation. Signals such as temperature, food supply, and levels of a dauer-inducing pheromone, a population density cue, influence this dauer decision. Dauer larvae are thus considered an alternative L3 stage larva, and this stage is sometimes preceded by L2d. L2d animals are considered pre-dauer and are characterised by delayed development and dark intestines produced by storage of fat. L2d larvae can either continue normal development or enter dauer stage depending on whether the conditions that triggered their formation persist. Dauer is not, however, a permanent condition. In fact, if the food supply and the population density become optimal for growth the dauer larvae can exit this stage and become L4s and then adults.

Dauer larvae are extensively studied by biologists because of their ability to survive harsh environments and live for extended periods of time. For example, C. elegans dauer larvae can survive up to four months, much longer than their average lifespan of about three weeks during normal reproductive development. Two genes that are essential for dauer formation are daf-2 and daf-23. Dauer formation in C. elegans requires a nuclear receptor DAF-12 and a forkhead transcription factor DAF-16. In favorable environments, DAF-12 is activated by a steroid hormone, called dafachronic acid, produced by the cytochrome p450, DAF-9. DAF-9 and DAF-12 have been implicated by Cynthia Kenyon and colleagues as being required for extended longevity seen in animals that lack germlines. Kenyon showed that, although the daf-16 gene is required for life extension in C. elegans, the life extension effect can be uncoupled from dauer growth arrest. The lifespan increase was shown to be associated with an increase in stress resistance.

A characteristic of the dauer stage is the pronounced alae which may be implicated in the entering (L1) and exiting (pre adult or L4 in C. elegans) of the dauer stage. The cuticle is thick and contains a unique striated zone in its basal area.

Dauer larvae generally remain motionless, but can react to touch or vibrations. They can also lift their bodies off a substrate and wave their heads in the air, sometimes as large groups, in a behaviour called nictation. Nictation is thought to allow dauer larvae to attach themselves to any passing animals, particularly insects, enabling them to travel to new food sources. For example, dauer larvae of rhabditids are often found in parallel rows under the elytra of dung beetles, which transport them to fresh supplies of dung. C. elegans strains lacking polyunsaturated fatty acids (PUFAs) undergo increased dauer arrest when grown without cholesterol. A study found endocannabinoids inhibit the dauer formation caused by PUFA deficiency or impaired cholesterol trafficking.

== Parasitism in dauer larva ==
=== The dauer hypothesis ===
The dauer hypothesis is a theory of evolutionary parasitism, named after the alternative, "dauer" stages of nematode development. It proposes that free-living nematode lineages evolved into parasites through two major steps, phoresy, and necromeny. Models of parasitic evolution are difficult to confirm because they are difficult to test. Like other methods of studying evolution, researchers can make use of genomic data, specifically while comparing data from closely related, non-parasitic species. Parasitism is common, and it is even more common in nematodes, which have evolved into parasitism on up to eighteen separate occasions throughout their evolutionary history. This calls into question what exactly about the nematode leads to such an inclination toward parasitism.

=== Theory development ===
The hypothesis was developed from the observation that roundworms, or nematodes, undergo the same four larval stages, some species only differing by having extra components to their life cycle, leading them to an optional alternative life stage during times of high stress. In some species this alternative stage leads to dormancy, pausing organism development until conditions are more favorable, and in others that alternative stage is used for group dispersion between different habitats through carrier animals. In both of these cases, the alternative stage is called the dauer. In parasitic species of nematodes, this alternative stage is called the "infective juvenile", and facilitates transmission not between environments, but hosts. All three of these optional stages share the common function of facilitating organism survival under states of high stress during larval stages and are similar in morphology. From this, the Dauer Hypothesis suggests that these three stages are homologous and that the parasitic “infective juvenile” life stage is derived from the ancestral, non-parasitic dauer larva.

=== Theory for parasitic evolution ===
Broadly, the Dauer hypothesis applies to all examples of parasitism in Nematoda. Four steps of an evolutionary sequence pathway to animal parasitism have been proposed. The steps are as follows: 1.) Free-living ancestors that do not associate with a larger species, 2) phoretic relationships in which nematodes superficially attach to a larger animal for dispersal, 3) necromeny, in which nematodes may feed on their dead hosts without directly contributing to the death themselves, and 4) parasitism.

Non-Association: Nematodes can live both on land and in water, residing in both soil and underwater sediment. However, as found by Rebecci et al. in their 2020 study, desiccation is a major selective force in only terrestrial environments, which the larva will combat by dauer dormancy. Phylogenetic analysis of nematodes suggests that parasitic lineages are derived overwhelmingly from terrestrial ancestors, even with lineages that reside in water. Both of these factors are supported by the dauer Hypothesis under the assumption that the dauer precedes the parasite, and is not influenced by earlier sources.

Phoresy: The next step in Crook's proposed plan is phoresy. Phoresy as a step for parasitism is not confined to nematode development and is seen similarly in Astigmata. Phoresy describes a non-parasitic relationship between two organisms, where one organism uses the other as a mode of transportation. In phoresy, there is a phoront, which is then transported species, and the vector, the mobile species through which the phoront travels. It is crucial to the evolution of parasitism due to both its initiation of close contact between the phoront and vector, as well as being a constraint on parasite size. The stressors of phoresy and parasitism are closely related, such as desiccation and starvation. This reliance on the vector mirrors the reliance on a host, both of which act on the affected organism's fitness. The need for phoresy is also much lower in marine environments, as marine nematodes can utilize currents as methods of low-effort transport. Therefore, an additional connection is formed between terrestrial species and eventual parasitism.

Necromeny: Necromeny is most effectively thought of as a parasitic extension of phoresy, in which the phoront will feed on the vector if it dies in transit, as well as using the body as a place for proliferation. However, necromeny has been found to select traits that reinterpret the vector not simply as transport, but also as a habitat. Necromeny does not necessarily eliminate the further need for phoresy. Because of this, it is thought that developing nematodes rely on both environmental signals, as well as communication with other larvae while making the choice between continuing development on their vector (necromeny) or attempting to find a new one (phoresy). For example, it has been found that dauers can communicate with other dauers via pheromones, in which adult nematodes signal larvae to continue their development. This can create a habitat shift in group environments, and can further parasitic larvae development.

Parasitsm: Through the development of phoresy to necromeny, developing larvae can officially reach a state of parasitism in their adulthood. In parasitic nematodes, there are two main methods of feeding: direct feeding and indirect feeding. In direct feeding, nematodes switch from their ancestral food source, such as bacteria, to their host vector's tissue. They utilize digestive enzymes for this process, by secreting them into the environment as opposed to internal use. However, in indirect feeding, nematodes weaponize bacteria to kill a host. For example, in George O. Poinar Jr's 1990 book on Nematodes and Biological Control, he describes Heterorhabditis, a genus of nematodes that harbors symbiotic bacteria that are highly pathogenic to hosts, but completely harmless to them. After the bacteria kill the host, they proliferate on the host's dead body. The Heterorhabditis then feeds on this new growth of bacteria for development. In both cases of feeding, the parasitic nematodes make direct use of the host's body, possible only through the evolutionary pathway aided by phoresy.

== See also ==
- Genetics of aging
- Polyphenism
