= Host microbe interactions in Caenorhabditis elegans =

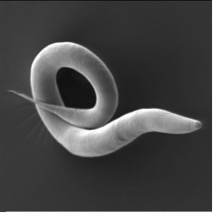
Electron micrograph of Caenorhabditis elegans

Caenorhabditis elegans- microbe interactions are defined as any interaction that encompasses the association with microbes that temporarily or permanently live in or on the nematode C. elegans. The microbes can engage in a commensal, mutualistic or pathogenic interaction with the host. These include bacterial, viral, unicellular eukaryotic, and fungal interactions. In nature C. elegans harbours a diverse set of microbes. In contrast, C. elegans strains that are cultivated in laboratories for research purposes have lost the natural associated microbial communities and are commonly maintained on a single bacterial strain, Escherichia coli OP50. However, E. coli OP50 does not allow for reverse genetic screens because RNAi libraries have only been generated in strain HT115. This limits the ability to study bacterial effects on host phenotypes. The host microbe interactions of C. elegans are closely studied because of their orthologs in humans. Therefore, the better we understand the host interactions of C. elegans the better we can understand the host interactions within the human body.

== Natural ecology ==
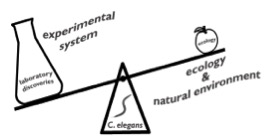
Imbalance between our knowledge of C. elegans biology gained by laboratory discoveries versus C. elegans natural ecology

C. elegans is a well-established model organism in different research fields, yet its ecology however is only poorly understood. They have a short development cycle only lasting three days with a total life span of about two weeks.C. elegans were previously considered a soil-living nematode, but in the last 10 years it was shown that natural habitats of C. elegans are microbe-rich, such as compost heaps, rotten plant material, and rotten fruits. Most of the studies on C. elegans are based on the N2 strain, which has adapted to laboratory conditions. Only in the last few years the natural ecology of C. elegans has been studied in more detail and one current research focus is its interaction with microbes. As C. elegans feeds on bacteria (microbivory), the intestine of worms isolated from the wild is usually filled with a large number of bacteria. In contrast to the very high diversity of bacteria in the natural habitat of C. elegans, the lab strains are only fed with one bacterial strain, the Escherichia coli derivate OP50 . OP50 was not co-isolated with C. elegans from nature, but was rather used because of its high convenience for laboratory maintenance. Bleaching is a common method in the laboratory to clean C. elegans of contaminations and to synchronize a population of worms. During bleaching the worms are treated with 5N NaOH and household bleach, leading to the death of all worms and survival of only the nematode eggs. The larvae hatching from these eggs lack any microbes, as none of the currently known C. elegans-associated microbes can be transferred vertically. Since most laboratory strains are kept under these gnotobiotic conditions, nothing is known about the composition of the C. elegans microbiota. The ecology of C. elegans can only be fully understood in the light of the multiple interactions with the microorganisms, which it encounters in the wild. The effect of microbes on C. elegans can vary from beneficial to lethal.

== Beneficial microbes ==
In its natural habitat C. elegans is constantly confronted with a variety of bacteria that could have both negative and positive effects on its fitness. To date, most research on C. elegans-microbe interactions focused on interactions with pathogens. Only recently, some studies addressed the role of commensal and mutualistic bacteria on C. elegans fitness. In these studies, C. elegans was exposed to various soil bacteria, either isolated in a different context or from C. elegans lab strains transferred to soil. These bacteria can affect C. elegans either directly through specific metabolites, or they can cause a change in the environmental conditions and thus induce a physiological response in the host. Beneficial bacteria can have a positive effect on the lifespan, generate certain pathogen resistances, or influence the development of C. elegans.

=== Lifespan extension ===
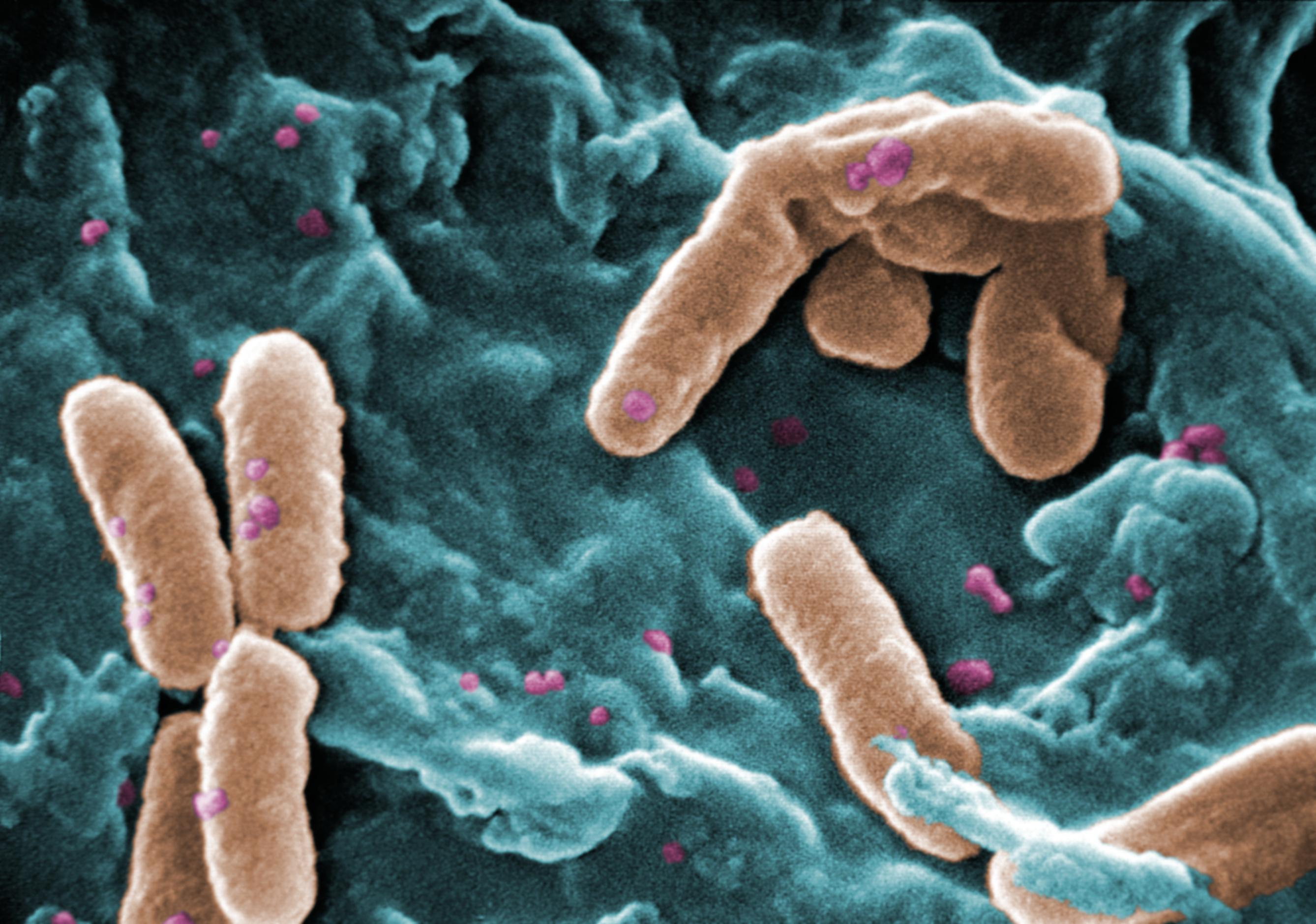
Pseudomonas

The lifespan of C. elegans is prolonged when grown on plates with Pseudomonas sp. or Bacillus megaterium compared to individuals living on E.coli. The lifespan extension mediated by B. megaterium is greater than that caused by Pseudomonas sp.. As determined by microarray analysis (a method, which allows the identification of C. elegans genes that are differentially expressed in response to different bacteria), 14 immune defence genes were up-regulated when C. elegans was grown on B. megaterium, while only two were up-regulated when fed with Pseudomonas sp. In addition to immune defence genes, other upregulated genes are involved in the synthesis of collagen and other cuticle components, indicating that the cuticle might play an important role in the interaction with microbes. Although some of the genes are known to be important for C. elegans lifespan extension, the precise underlying mechanisms still remain unclear.

=== Protection against microbes ===
The microbial communities residing inside the host body have now been recognized to be important for effective immune responses. Yet the molecular mechanisms underlying this protection are largely unknown. Bacteria can help the host to fight against pathogens either by directly stimulating the immune response or by competing with the pathogenic bacteria for available resources. In C. elegans, some associated bacteria seem to generate protection against pathogens. For example, when C. elegans is grown on Bacillus megaterium or Pseudomonas mendocina, worms are more resistant to infection with the pathogenic bacterium Pseudomonas aeruginosa [21], which is a common bacterium in C. elegans' natural environment and therefore a potential natural pathogen. This protection is characterized by prolonged survival on P. aeruginosa in combination with a delayed colonization of C. elegans by the pathogen. Due to its comparatively large size B. megaterium is not an optimal food source for C. elegans, resulting in a delayed development and a reduced reproductive rate. The ability of B. megaterium to enhance resistance against the infection with P. aeruginosa seems to be linked to the decrease in reproductive rate. However, the protection against P. aeruginosa infection provided by P. mendocina is reproduction independent, and depends on the p38 mitogen-activated protein kinase pathway. P. mendocina is able to activate the p38 MAPK pathway and thus to stimulate the immune response of C. elegans against the pathogen. A common way for an organism to protect itself against microbes is to increase fecundation to increase the surviving individuals in the face of an attack. This defense against parasites are genetically linked to stress response pathways and dependent on the innate immune system.

=== Effects on development ===
Caenorhabditis elegans late embryonic development

Under natural conditions it might be advantageous for C. elegans to develop as fast as possible to be able to reproduce rapidly. The bacterium Comamonas DA1877 accelerates the development of C. elegans. Neither TOR (target of rapamycin), nor insulin signalling seem to mediate this effect on the accelerated development. It is thus possible that secreted metabolites of Comamonas, which might be sensed by C. elegans, lead to faster development. Worms that were fed with Comamonas DA1877 also showed a reduced number of offspring and a reduced lifespan. Another microbe that accelerates C. elegans' growth are L . sphaericus. This bacteria significantly increased the growth rate of C. elegans when compared to their normal diet of E. coli OP50. C. elegans are mostly grown and observed in a controlled laboratory with a controlled diet, therefore, they may show differential growth rates with naturally occurring microbes.

== Pathogenic microbes ==
In its natural environment C. elegans is confronted with a variety of different potential pathogens. C. elegans has been used intensively as a model organism for studying host-pathogen interactions and the immune system. These studies revealed that C. elegans has well-functioning innate immune defenses. The first line of defense is the extremely tough cuticle that provides an external barrier against pathogen invasion. In addition, several conserved signaling pathways contribute to defense, including the DAF-2/DAF-16 insulin-like receptor pathway and several MAP kinase pathways, which activate physiological immune responses. Finally, pathogen avoidance behavior represents another line of C. elegans immune defense. All these defense mechanisms do not work independently, but jointly to ensure an optimal defense response against pathogens. Many microorganisms were found to be pathogenic for C. elegans under laboratory conditions. To identify potential C. elegans pathogens, worms in the L4 larval stage are transferred to a medium that contains the organism of interest, which is a bacterium in most cases. Pathogenicity of the organism can be inferred by measuring the lifespan of worms. There are several known human pathogens that have a negative effect on C. elegans survival. Pathogenic bacteria can also form biofilms, whose sticky exopolymer matrix could impede C. elegans motility and cloaks bacterial quorum sensing chemoattractants from predator detection. Biofilms can secrete iron siderophores which can be detected by C.elegans . However, only very few natural C. elegans pathogens are currently known.

=== Eukaryotic microbes ===
One of the best studied natural pathogens of C. elegans is the microsporidium Nematocida parisii, which was directly isolated from wild-caught C. elegans. N. parisii is an intracellular parasite that is exclusively transmitted horizontally from one animal to another. The microsporidian spores are likely to exit the cells by disrupting a conserved cytoskeletal structure in the intestine called the terminal web. It seems that none of the known immune pathways of C. elegans is involved in mediating resistance against N. parisii. Microsporidia were found in several nematodes isolated from different locations, indicating that microsporidia are common natural parasites of C. elegans. The N. parisii-C. elegans system represents a very useful tool to study infection mechanisms of intracellular parasites. Additionally, a new species of microsporidia was recently found in a wild caught C. elegans that genome sequencing places in the same genus Nematocida as prior microsporidia seen in these nematodes. This new species was named Nematocida displodere, after a phenotype seen in late infected worms that explode at the vulva to release infectious spores. N. displodere was shown to infect a broad range of tissues and cell types in C. elegans, including the epidermis, muscle, neurons, intestine, seam cells, and coelomocytes. Strangely, the majority of intestinal infection fails to grow to later parasite stages, while the muscle and epidermal infection thrives. This is in stark contrast to N. parisii which infects and completes its entire life cycle in the C. elegans intestine. These related Nematocida species are being used to study the host and pathogen mechanisms responsible for allowing or blocking eukaryotic parasite growth in different tissue niches. Another eukaryotic pathogen is the fungus Drechmeria coniospora, which has not been directly co-isolated with C. elegans from nature, but is still considered to be a natural pathogen of C. elegans. D. coniospora attaches to the cuticle of the worm at the vulva, mouth, and anus and its hyphae penetrate the cuticle. In this way D. coniospora infects the worm from the outside, while the majority of bacterial pathogens infect the worm from the intestinal lumen.

=== Viral pathogens ===
In 2011 the first naturally associated virus was isolated from C. elegans found outside of a laboratory. The Orsay virus is an RNA virus that is closely related to nodaviruses. The virus is not stably integrated into the host genome. It is transmitted horizontally under laboratory conditions. An antiviral RNAi pathway is essential for C. elegans resistance against Orsay virus infection. To date there has not been a virus, other intracellular pathogens, or multicellular parasite that have been able to affect the nematode. Because of this we cannot use C. elegans as an experimental system for these interactions. In 2005, two reports have shown that vesicular stomatitis virus (VSV), an arbovirus with a many invertebrate and vertebrate host range, could replicate in primary cells derived from C. elegans embryos.

=== Bacterial pathogens ===
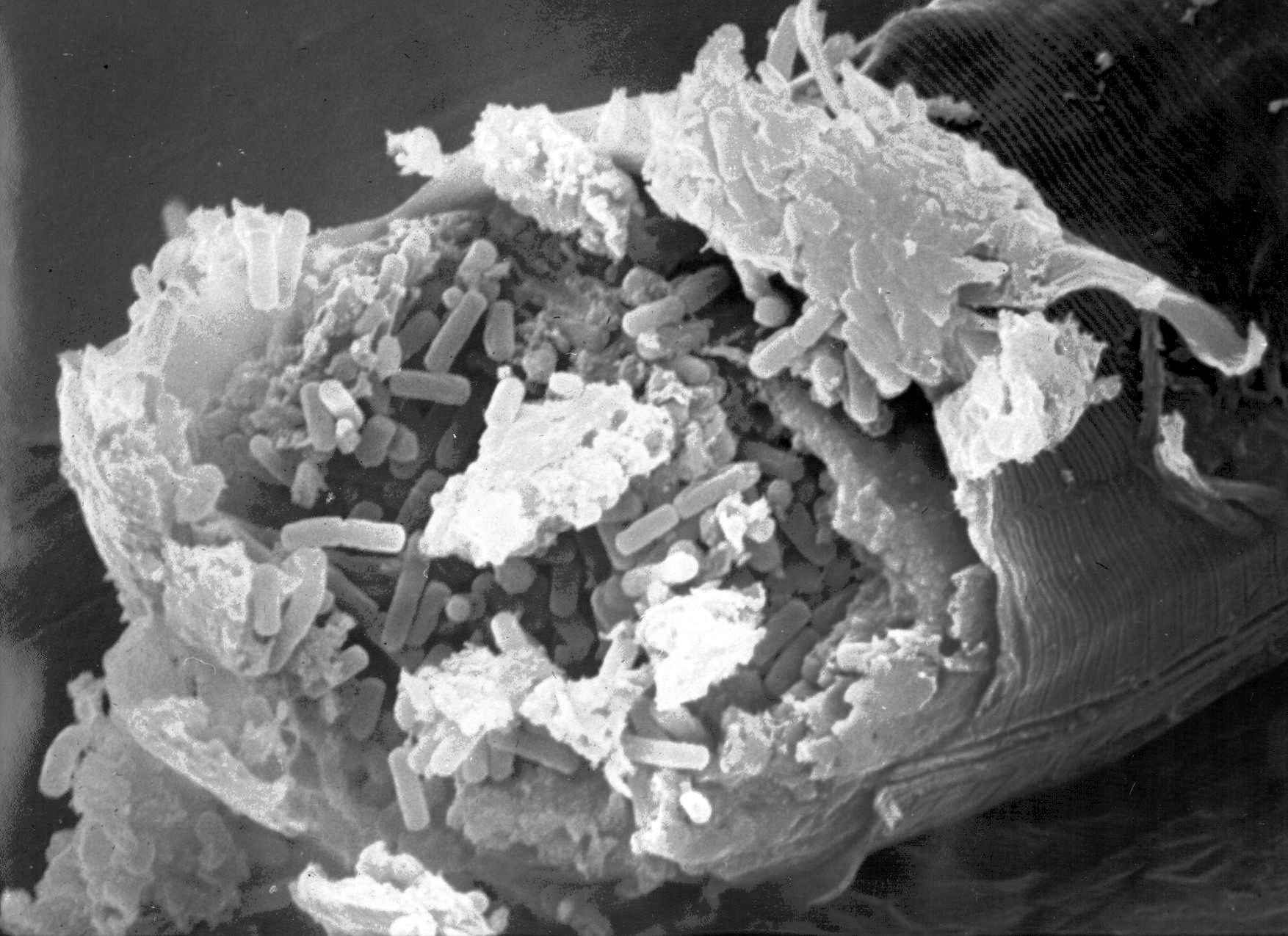
Caenorhabditis elegans intestine infected with Bacillus thuringiensis

Two bacterial strains of the genus Leucobacter were co-isolated from nature with the two Caenorhabditis species C. briggsae and C. n. spp 11, and named Verde 1 and Verde 2. These two Leucobacter strains showed contrasting pathogenic effects in C. elegans. Worms that were infected with Verde 2 produced a deformed anal region ("Dar" phenotype), while infections with Verde 1 resulted in slower growth due to coating of the cuticle with the bacterial strain. In liquid culture Verde 1 infected worms stuck together with their tails and formed so called "worm stars". The trapped worms cannot free themselves and eventually die. After death C. elegans is then used as a food source for the bacteria. Only larvae in the L4 stage seem to be able to escape by autotomy. They split their bodies into half, so that the anterior half can escape. The "half-worms" remain viable for several days. The Gram-positive bacterium Bacillus thuringiensis is likely associated with C. elegans in nature. B. thuringiensis is a soil bacterium that is often used in infection experiments with C. elegans. It produces spore-forming toxins, called crystal (Cry) toxins, which are associated with spores. These are jointly taken up by C. elegans orally. Inside the host, the toxins bind to the surface of intestinal cells, where the formation of pores in intestinal cells is induced, causing their destruction. The resulting change in milieu in the gut leads to germination of the spores, which subsequently proliferate in the worm body. An aspect of the C. elegans–B. thuringiensis system is the high variability in pathogenicity between different strains. There are highly pathogenic strains, but also strains that are less or even non-pathogenic.

== See also ==
- Caenorhabditis elegans
- Gnotobiosis
- Microbiome in the Drosophila gut
- Microbiota
