= Raghuveer Parthasarathy =

American biophysicist (born 1976)

- Born: 1976 (age 48–49); Mysore, India
- Citizenship: American
- Occupation: Biophysicist
- Title: Professor
- Awards: 2020 Fellow of the American Physical Society; 2020 Williams Fellow, for innovation in teaching and learning 2008 National Science Foundation CAREER Award; 2007 Alfred P. Sloan Research Fellowship

Academic background
- Education: 1997 A.B. University of California, Berkeley; 2002 Ph.D. University of Chicago
- Thesis: Electronic transport in arrays of gold nanocrystals (2002)
- Doctoral advisor: Thomas F. Rosenbaum and Heinrich M. Jaeger

Academic work
- Discipline: Biophysics
- Website: https://pages.uoregon.edu/raghu/

Raghuveer Parthasarathy (born 1976) is an American biophysicist, and an Alec and Kay Keith Professor of Physics on the faculty of the University of Oregon.

== Early life and education ==
Born in 1976 in Mysore, India, Parthasarathy is the son of Sampath and Kalyani (née Rangaswamy) Parthasarathy. He became a U.S.citizen at age twelve in 1988 in San Diego, California.

Parthasarathy earned an A.B. in physics in 1997 from the University of California, Berkeley, and a Ph.D. physics in 2002 from the University of Chicago, with the dissertation, Electronic transport in arrays of gold nanocrystals, advised by Thomas F. Rosenbaum and Heinrich M. Jaeger.

== Career ==
Following a four year post-doc as a Miller Research Fellow at Berkeley, Parthasarathy joined the physic faculty at the University of Oregon in 2006. As a member of both the Institute of Molecular Biology and the Materials Science Institute, he researches topics of "biophysics, microbial communities, host-microbe interactions, and advanced microscopy techniques".

Since 2016, Parthasarathy has served as co-director of the University of Oregon Science Literacy Program.

Parthasarathy was named Alec and Kay Keith Professor in 2016, and promoted to full professor in 2017.

== Selected publications ==
=== Books ===
- Parthasarathy, Raghuveer (February 8, 2022). So Simple a Beginning. Princeton University Press. ISBN 978-0-691-20040-8.

=== Articles ===
- Scheibel, Thomas; Parthasarathy, Raghuveer; Sawicki, George; Lin, Xiao-Min; Jaeger, Heinrich; Lindquist, Susan L. (April 15, 2003). "Conducting nanowires built by controlled self-assembly of amyloid fibers and selective metal deposition". Proceedings of the National Academy of Sciences. 100 (8): 4527–4532. Bibcode:2003PNAS..100.4527S. doi:10.1073/pnas.0431081100. ISSN 0027-8424. PMC 153589. PMID 12672964.
- Parthasarathy, Raghuveer (June 10, 2012). "Rapid, accurate particle tracking by calculation of radial symmetry centers". Nature Methods. 9 (7): 724–726. doi:10.1038/nmeth.2071. ISSN 1548-7105. PMID 22688415. S2CID 16320629.
- Parthasarathy, Raghuveer; Lin, Xiao-Min; Jaeger, Heinrich M. (October 16, 2001). "Electronic Transport in Metal Nanocrystal Arrays: The Effect of Structural Disorder on Scaling Behavior". Physical Review Letters. 87 (18) 186807. arXiv:cond-mat/0102446. Bibcode:2001PhRvL..87r6807P. doi:10.1103/PhysRevLett.87.186807. S2CID 34222150.
- Parthasarathy, Raghuveer; Lin, Xiao-Min; Jaeger, Heinrich M. (October 16, 2001). "Electronic Transport in Metal Nanocrystal Arrays: The Effect of Structural Disorder on Scaling Behavior". Physical Review Letters. 87 (18) 186807. arXiv:cond-mat/0102446. Bibcode:2001PhRvL..87r6807P. doi:10.1103/PhysRevLett.87.186807. S2CID 34222150.
- Parthasarathy, Raghuveer; Yu, Cheng-han; Groves, Jay T. (May 1, 2006). "Curvature-Modulated Phase Separation in Lipid Bilayer Membranes". Langmuir. 22 (11): 5095–5099. doi:10.1021/la060390o. ISSN 0743-7463. PMID 16700599.
- Hammers, Matthew D.; Taormina, Michael J.; Cerda, Matthew M.; Montoya, Leticia A.; Seidenkranz, Daniel T.; Parthasarathy, Raghuveer; Pluth, Michael D. (August 19, 2015). "A Bright Fluorescent Probe for H 2 S Enables Analyte-Responsive, 3D Imaging in Live Zebrafish Using Light Sheet Fluorescence Microscopy". Journal of the American Chemical Society. 137 (32): 10216–10223. doi:10.1021/jacs.5b04196. ISSN 0002-7863. PMC 4543995. PMID 26061541.
- Wiles, Travis J.; Jemielita, Matthew; Baker, Ryan P.; Schlomann, Brandon H.; Logan, Savannah L.; Ganz, Julia; Melancon, Ellie; Eisen, Judith S.; Guillemin, Karen; Parthasarathy, Raghuveer (July 26, 2016). "Host Gut Motility Promotes Competitive Exclusion within a Model Intestinal Microbiota". PLOS Biology. 14 (7) e1002517. doi:10.1371/journal.pbio.1002517. ISSN 1545-7885. PMC 4961409. PMID 27458727.
- Logan, Savannah L.; Thomas, Jacob; Yan, Jinyuan; Baker, Ryan P.; Shields, Drew S.; Xavier, Joao B.; Hammer, Brian K.; Parthasarathy, Raghuveer (April 17, 2018). "The Vibrio cholerae type VI secretion system can modulate host intestinal mechanics to displace gut bacterial symbionts". Proceedings of the National Academy of Sciences. 115 (16): E3779 – E3787. Bibcode:2018PNAS..115E3779L. doi:10.1073/pnas.1720133115. ISSN 0027-8424. PMC 5910850. PMID 29610339.
- Groves, Jay T.; Parthasarathy, Raghuveer; Forstner, Martin B. (August 1, 2008). "Fluorescence Imaging of Membrane Dynamics". Annual Review of Biomedical Engineering. 10 (1): 311–338. doi:10.1146/annurev.bioeng.10.061807.160431. ISSN 1523-9829. PMID 18429702.
- Rolig, Annah S.; Parthasarathy, Raghuveer; Burns, Adam R.; Bohannan, Brendan J. M.; Guillemin, Karen (November 11, 2015). "Individual Members of the Microbiota Disproportionately Modulate Host Innate Immune Responses". Cell Host & Microbe. 18 (5): 613–620. doi:10.1016/j.chom.2015.10.009. ISSN 1931-3128. PMC 4701053. PMID 26567512.
- Parthasarathy, Raghuveer; Lin, Xiao-Min; Elteto, Klara; Rosenbaum, T. F.; Jaeger, Heinrich M. (February 18, 2004). "Percolating through Networks of Random Thresholds: Finite Temperature Electron Tunneling in Metal Nanocrystal Arrays". Physical Review Letters. 92 (7) 076801. arXiv:cond-mat/0302348. Bibcode:2004PhRvL..92g6801P. doi:10.1103/PhysRevLett.92.076801. PMID 14995875. S2CID 5757241.

== Awards, honors ==
- In 2020, Parthasarathy was elected a Fellow of the American Physical Society, cited For creative and innovative contributions to biological physics especially to our understanding of the gut microbiome and lipid bilayers.
- 2020 Williams Fellow
- 2008 National Science Foundation CAREER Award, NSF's Biomaterials Program, providing $475,000 over the five years.
- 2007 Alfred P. Sloan Research Fellowship
