= Colleen Murphy =

Colleen Murphy may refer to:

- Colleen Murphy (filmmaker), Canadian screenwriter, director, and playwright
- Colleen 'Cosmo' Murphy (born 1968), American radio host
- Coleen T. Murphy, American geneticist
- Colleen Murphy (swim coach), American swimming coach

== See also ==
- Colin Murphy (disambiguation)
