= Daf-9 =

Cytochrome P450 daf-9

Identifiers
- Organism: Caenorhabditis elegans
- Symbol: daf-9
- Alt. symbols: CYP22A1
- Entrez: 180889
- Orthologs: NCBI: entry; OMA: entry
- RefSeq (mRNA): NM_001029732.2
- RefSeq (Prot): NP_001024903.1
- UniProt: H2KYS3

Other data
- Chromosome: X: 6.2 - 6.2 Mb
Search for
- Structures: Swiss-model
- Domains: InterPro

The daf-9 gene encodes a cytochrome p450 enzyme that catalyses the generation of dafachronic acid (a steroid hormone) in the worm Caenorhabditis elegans, with the CYP Symbol CYP22A1 (Cytochrome P450, family 22, member A1). After generation, dafachronic acid will bind its nuclear receptor Daf-12, whose genetic mutation has been implicated by Cynthia Kenyon and colleagues as related to the formation of Dauer larva.
