= CYP35B1 =

Protein-coding gene in the species Caenorhabditis elegans

Cytochrome P450 Dod-13

Identifiers
- Organism: Caenorhabditis elegans
- Symbol: Dod-13
- Alt. symbols: CYP35B1
- Entrez: 178803
- Orthologs: NCBI: entry; OMA: entry
- RefSeq (mRNA): NM_001322546
- UniProt: O44650

Other data
- Chromosome: V: 3.94 - 3.94 Mb
Search for
- Structures: Swiss-model
- Domains: InterPro

The Dod-13 gene in the worm Caenorhabditis elegans encoding a cytochrome p450 enzyme, which have steroid hydroxylase activity, with the CYP Symbol CYP35B1 (Cytochrome P450, family 35, member B1). Dod-13 is downstream gene of Daf-16 influenced the lifespan of C. elegans.
