= Age of onset =

Age at which one acquires a disease or disorder

The age of onset is the age at which an individual acquires, develops, or first experiences a condition or symptoms of a disease or disorder. For instance, the general age of onset for the spinal disease scoliosis is "10-15 years old," meaning that most people develop scoliosis when they are of age between ten and fifteen years.

Diseases are often categorized by their age of onset as congenital, infantile, juvenile, or adult. Missed or delayed diagnosis often occurs if a disease that is typically diagnosed in juveniles (such as asthma) is present in adults, and vice versa (such as arthritis). Depending on the disease, ages of onset may impact features such as phenotype, as is the case in Parkinson's and Huntington's diseases. For example, the phenotype for juvenile Huntington's disease clearly differs from adult-onset Huntington's disease and late-onset Parkinson's exhibits more severe motor and non-motor phenotypes.

== Causes ==
Germ-line mutations are often at least in part the cause of disease onset at an earlier age. Though many germ-line mutations are deleterious, the genetic lens through which they may be viewed may provide insights to treatment, possibly through genetic counseling.

In some cases, the age of onset may be the result of mutation accumulation. If this is the case, it could be helpful to consider ages of onset as a product of the hypotheses depicted in theories of aging. Even some mental health disorders, whose ages of onset have been found to be harder to define than physical illnesses may have a mutated component. The symptoms of standard mental disorders often start off non-specific. Pathological changes pertaining to disorders often become more detailed and less fickle before they can be defined in the American Psychiatric Association's DSM. The brain is a dynamic and complex system, it is constantly re-wiring itself and a major concern is what happens to the brain in earlier life that mirrors what occurs later in its psycho-pathological state. The typical onset of many mental disorders in late adolescence may reflect the critical development that happens at this time.

== Theories of Aging ==
The rate-of-living theory of aging states that senescence occurs because individuals accumulate damage to cells and tissues during cell division. This theory is not supported because its postulates that aging rate should be correlated with metabolic rate and organisms cannot evolve longer lifespans were not supported in trials. The rate-of-living theory may not be used to draw conclusions about age of onset based on this.

There are two subsets to the evolutionary theory of aging: antagonistic pleiotropy hypothesis and the mutation accumulation hypothesis.

The antagonistic pleiotropy hypothesis was tested by monitoring the age-1 gene in C. elegans. The age-1 gene plays a role in senescence; nematodes with mutations in this gene live up to 80% longer. Mutants in the age-1 gene for allele hx546 seem to be otherwise normal until placed under stressful conditions. Then, the carriers of the mutant gene appear to be at disadvantage—they do not lay eggs while being starved. This evidence supports antagonistic pleiotropy as a theory of aging, and therefore as an onset cause in some cases.

The mutation accumulation hypothesis was tested by demonstrating how quickly deleterious mutations can accumulate in Musca domestica. Reed and Bryant demonstrated this by limiting the lifespan of the flies to a few days, which made late-life mutations invisible to selection since they occurred after reproduction. The lifespan of the flies was monitored by allowing them to carry out their complete lifespan every few generations, which was reported to decline substantially. Mutation accumulation is supported as a theory of aging, and therefore an onset cause in cases of diseases resulting from mutation accumulation.
