= Colin Murphy =

Colin Murphy may refer to:

- Colin Murphy (comedian) (born 1968), Irish comedian
- Colin Murphy (ice hockey) (born 1980), Canadian ice hockey player
- Colin Murphy (footballer, born 1944) (1944–2023), English football (soccer) player and manager
- Colin Murphy (footballer, born 1991), New Zealand football (soccer) player
- Colin Murphy (Days of Our Lives), character on soap opera Days of our Lives
- Col Murphy, Australian rugby league player

== See also ==
- Coleen T. Murphy, American geneticist
- Colleen Murphy (disambiguation)
