= Genetics of aging =

Genetics in relation to aging and lifespans

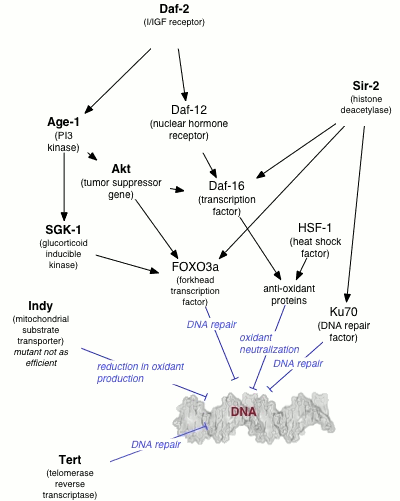
Many life span influencing genes affect the rate of DNA damage or DNA repair.

Genetics of aging is generally concerned with genetic effects involved in biological mechanisms of normal aging, as well as life extension associated with genetic alterations and accelerated aging diseases leading to reduction in lifespan.

The first mutation found to increase longevity in an animal was the age-1 gene in Caenorhabditis elegans. Michael Klass discovered that lifespan of C. elegans could be altered by mutations, but Klass believed that the effect was due to reduced food consumption (calorie restriction). Thomas Johnson later showed that life extension of up to 65% was due to the mutation itself rather than due to calorie restriction, and he named the gene age-1 in the expectation that other genes that control aging would be found. The age-1 gene encodes the catalytic subunit of class-I phosphatidylinositol 3-kinase (PI3K).

A decade after Johnson's discovery daf-2, one of the two genes that are essential for dauer larva formation, was shown by Cynthia Kenyon to double C. elegans lifespan. Kenyon showed that the daf-2 mutants, which would form dauers above 25 °C (77 °F) would bypass the dauer state below 20 °C (68 °F) with a doubling of lifespan. Prior to Kenyon's study it was commonly believed that lifespan could only be increased at the cost of a loss of reproductive capacity, but Kenyon's nematodes maintained youthful reproductive capacity as well as extended youth in general. Subsequent genetic modification (PI3K-null mutation) to C. elegans was shown to extend maximum life span tenfold.

Long-lived mutants of C. elegans (age-1 and daf-2) were demonstrated to be resistant to oxidative stress and UV light. These long-lived mutants had a higher DNA repair capability than wild-type C. elegans. Knockdown of the nucleotide excision repair gene Xpa-1 increased sensitivity to UV and reduced the life span of the long-lived mutants. These findings support the hypothesis that DNA damage has a significant role in the aging process.

Genetic modifications in other species have not achieved as great a lifespan extension as have been seen for C. elegans. Drosophila melanogaster lifespan has been doubled. Genetic mutations in mice can increase maximum lifespan to 1.5 times normal, and up to 1.7 times normal when combined with calorie restriction.

In yeast, NAD+-dependent histone deacetylase Sir2 is required for genomic silencing at three loci: the yeast mating loci, the telomeres and the ribosomal DNA (rDNA). In some species of yeast, replicative aging may be partially caused by homologous recombination between rDNA repeats; excision of rDNA repeats results in the formation of extrachromosomal rDNA circles (ERCs). These ERCs replicate and preferentially segregate to the mother cell during cell division, and are believed to result in cellular senescence by titrating away (competing for) essential nuclear factors. ERCs have not been observed in other species (nor even all strains of the same yeast species) of yeast (which also display replicative senescence), and ERCs are not believed to contribute to aging in higher organisms such as humans (they have not been shown to accumulate in mammals in a similar manner to yeast). Extrachromosomal circular DNA (eccDNA) has been found in worms, flies, and humans. The origin and role of eccDNA in aging, if any, is unknown.

Despite the lack of a connection between circular DNA and aging in higher organisms, extra copies of Sir2 are capable of extending the lifespan of both worms and flies (though, in flies, this finding has not been replicated by other investigators, and the activator of Sir2 resveratrol does not reproducibly increase lifespan in either species.) Whether the Sir2 homologues in higher organisms have any role in lifespan is unclear, but the human SIRT1 protein has been demonstrated to deacetylate p53, Ku70, and the forkhead family of transcription factors. SIRT1 can also regulate acetylates such as CBP/p300, and has been shown to deacetylate specific histone residues.

RAS1 and RAS2 also affect aging in yeast and have a human homologue. RAS2 overexpression has been shown to extend lifespan in yeast.

Other genes regulate aging in yeast by increasing the resistance to oxidative stress. Superoxide dismutase, a protein that protects against the effects of mitochondrial free radicals, can extend yeast lifespan in stationary phase when overexpressed.

In higher organisms, aging is likely to be regulated in part through the insulin/IGF-1 pathway. Mutations that affect insulin-like signaling in worms, flies, and the growth hormone/IGF1 axis in mice are associated with extended lifespan. In yeast, Sir2 activity is regulated by the nicotinamidase PNC1. PNC1 is transcriptionally upregulated under stressful conditions such as caloric restriction, heat shock, and osmotic shock. By converting nicotinamide to niacin, nicotinamide is removed, inhibiting the activity of Sir2. A nicotinamidase found in humans, known as PBEF, may serve a similar function, and a secreted form of PBEF known as visfatin may help to regulate serum insulin levels. It is not known, however, whether these mechanisms also exist in humans, since there are obvious differences in biology between humans and model organisms.

Sir2 activity has been shown to increase under calorie restriction. Due to the lack of available glucose in the cells, more NAD+ is available and can activate Sir2. Resveratrol, a stilbenoid found in the skin of red grapes, was reported to extend the lifespan of yeast, worms, and flies (the lifespan extension in flies and worms have proved to be irreproducible by independent investigators). It has been shown to activate Sir2 and therefore mimics the effects of calorie restriction, if one accepts that caloric restriction is indeed dependent on Sir2.

According to the GenAge database of aging-related genes, there are over 1800 genes altering lifespan in model organisms: 838 in the soil roundworm (Caenorhabditis elegans), 883 in the bakers' yeast (Saccharomyces cerevisiae), 170 in the fruit fly (Drosophila melanogaster) and 126 in the mouse (Mus musculus).

The following is a list of genes connected to longevity through research on model organisms:

| Podospora | Saccharomyces | Caenorhabditis | Drosophila | Mus |
|---|---|---|---|---|
| grisea | LAG1 | daf-2 | sod1 | Prop-1 |
| | LAC1 | age-1/daf-23 | cat1 | p66shc (Not independently verified) |
| | pit-1 | Ghr | | |
| | RAS1 | daf-18 | mth | mclk1 |
| | RAS2 | akt-1/akt-2 | | |
| | PHB1 | daf-16 | | |
| | PHB2 | daf-12 | | |
| | CDC7 | ctl-1 | | |
| | BUD1 | old-1 | | |
| | RTG2 | spe-26 | | |
| | RPD3 | clk-1 | | |
| | HDA1 | mev-1 | | |
| | SIR2 | | | |
| | | aak-2 | | |
| | SIR4-42 | | | |
| | UTH4 | | | |
| | YGL023 | | | |
| | SGS1 | | | |
| | RAD52 | | | |
| | FOB1 | | | |

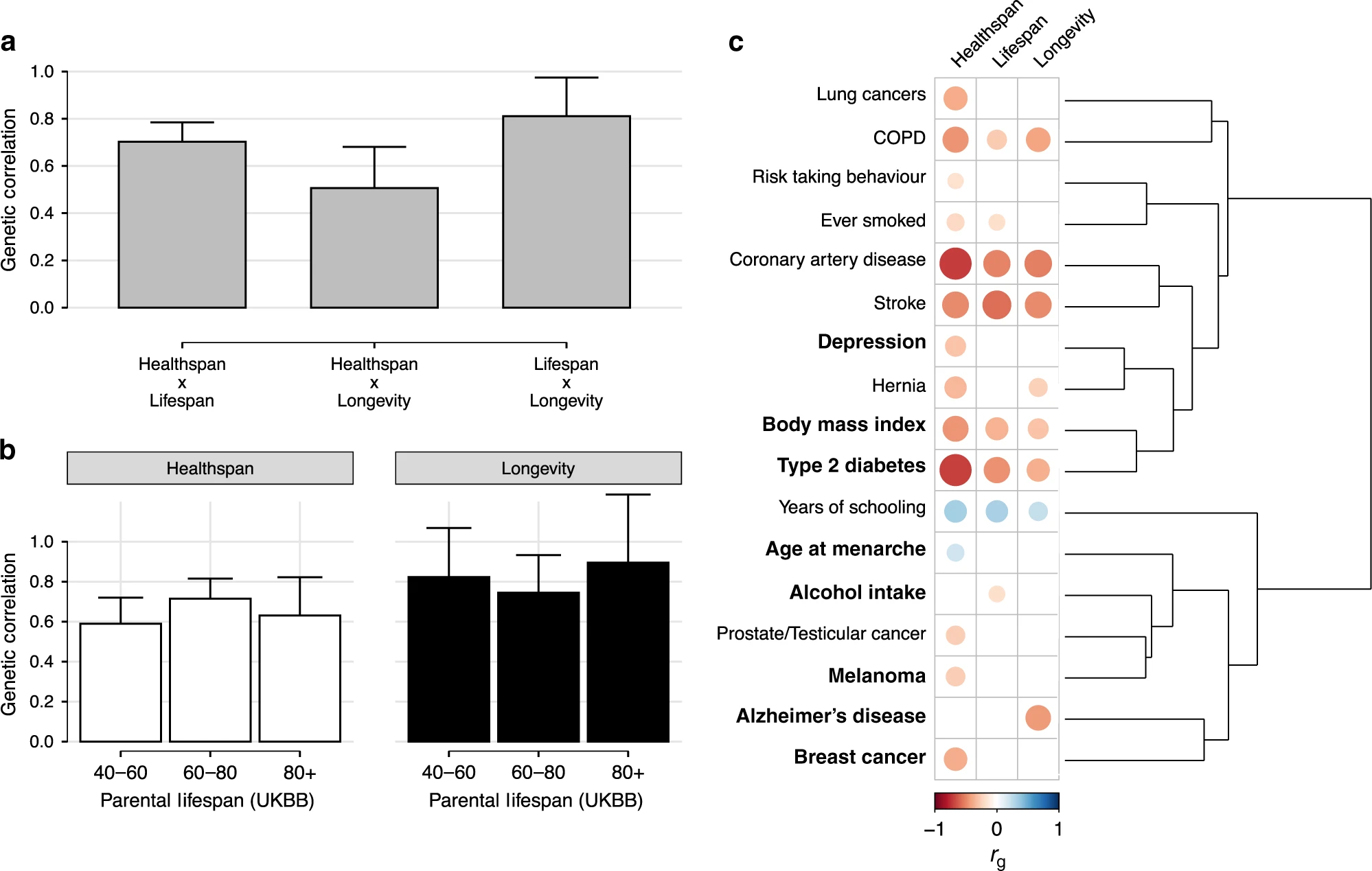
"Healthspan, parental lifespan, and longevity are highly genetically correlated."

In July 2020 scientists, using public biological data on 1.75 m people with known lifespans overall, identify 10 genomic loci which appear to intrinsically influence healthspan, lifespan, and longevity – of which half have not been reported previously at genome-wide significance and most being associated with cardiovascular disease – and identify haem metabolism as a promising candidate for further research within the field. Their study suggests that high levels of iron in the blood likely reduce, and genes involved in metabolising iron likely increase healthy years of life in humans.

Ned Sharpless and collaborators demonstrated the first in vivo link between p16-expression and lifespan. They found reduced p16 expression in some tissues of mice with mutations that extend lifespan, as well as in mice that had their lifespan extended by food restriction. Jan van Deursen and Darren Baker in collaboration with Andre Terzic at the Mayo Clinic in Rochester, Minn., provided the first in vivo evidence for a causal link between cellular senescence and aging by preventing the accumulation of senescent cells in BubR1 progeroid mice. In the absence of senescent cells, the mice's tissues showed a major improvement in the usual burden of age-related disorders. They did not develop cataracts, avoided the usual wasting of muscle with age. They retained the fat layers in the skin that usually thin out with age and, in people, cause wrinkling. A second study led by Jan van Deursen in collaboration with a team of collaborators at the Mayo Clinic and Groningen University, provided the first direct in vivo evidence that cellular senescence causes signs of aging by eliminating senescent cells from progeroid mice by introducing a drug-inducible suicide gene and then treating the mice with the drug to kill senescent cells selectively, as opposed to decreasing whole body p16. Another Mayo study led by James Kirkland in collaboration with Scripps and other groups demonstrated that senolytics, drugs that target senescent cells, enhance cardiac function and improve vascular reactivity in old mice, alleviate gait disturbance caused by radiation in mice, and delay frailty, neurological dysfunction, and osteoporosis in progeroid mice. Discovery of senolytic drugs was based on a hypothesis-driven approach: the investigators leveraged the observation that senescent cells are resistant to apoptosis to discover that pro-survival pathways are up-regulated in these cells. They demonstrated that these survival pathways are the "Achilles heel" of senescent cells using RNA interference approaches, including Bcl-2-, AKT-, p21-, and tyrosine kinase-related pathways. They then used drugs known to target the identified pathways and showed these drugs kill senescent cells by apoptosis in culture and decrease senescent cell burden in multiple tissues in vivo. Importantly, these drugs had long term effects after a single dose, consistent with removal of senescent cells, rather than a temporary effect requiring continued presence of the drugs. This was the first study to show that clearing senescent cells enhances function in chronologically aged mice.

== Genetically determined DNA repair capability and aging ==
The genetically determined capability to repair DNA damage appears to be a key aging factor in comparisons of several species of birds and animals. When the rate of accumulation of DNA damage (double-strand breaks) in the leukocytes of dolphins, goats, reindeer, American flamingos, and griffon vultures was compared to the longevity of individuals of these different species, it was found that the species with longer lifespans have slower accumulation of DNA damage. The activity of the enzyme PARP1, employed in several DNA repair process, was compared in thirteen different mammalian species and its activity was found to correlate with the maximum lifespan of the species. In humans, genetically determined DNA repair capability appears to influence lifespan. Lymphoblastoid cell lines established from blood samples of humans who lived past 100 years (centenarians) were found to have a significantly higher activity of the DNA repair protein Poly (ADP-ribose) polymerase (PARP) than cell lines from younger individuals (20 to 70 years old).

== Hurdles for increasing longevity ==
=== Paternal age effect ===
A 2008 paper found a U-shaped association between paternal age and the overall mortality rate in children (i.e., mortality rate up to age 18). Although the relative mortality rates were higher, the absolute numbers were low, because of the relatively low occurrence of genetic abnormality. The study has been criticized for not adjusting for maternal health, which could have a large effect on child mortality. The researchers also found a correlation between paternal age and offspring death by injury or poisoning, indicating the need to control for social and behavioral confounding factors.

In 2012, a study showed that greater age at paternity tends to increase telomere length in offspring for up to two generations. Since telomere length affects health and mortality, this may affect the health and aging rate of the offspring. The authors speculated that this effect may provide a mechanism by which populations have some plasticity in adapting longevity to different social and ecological contexts.

== See also ==
- Genetics of autism
- Genetics of obesity
- Strategies for engineered negligible senescence

== Bibliography ==
- Tournaye, Herman (June 2009). "Male Reproductive Ageing". In Bewley, Susan; Ledger, William; Nikolaou, Dimitrios (eds.). Reproductive Ageing. Cambridge University Press. pp. 95–104. doi:10.1017/CBO9781107784734.012. ISBN 978-1-906985-13-4.
