= FOXO3 =

Protein-coding gene in humans

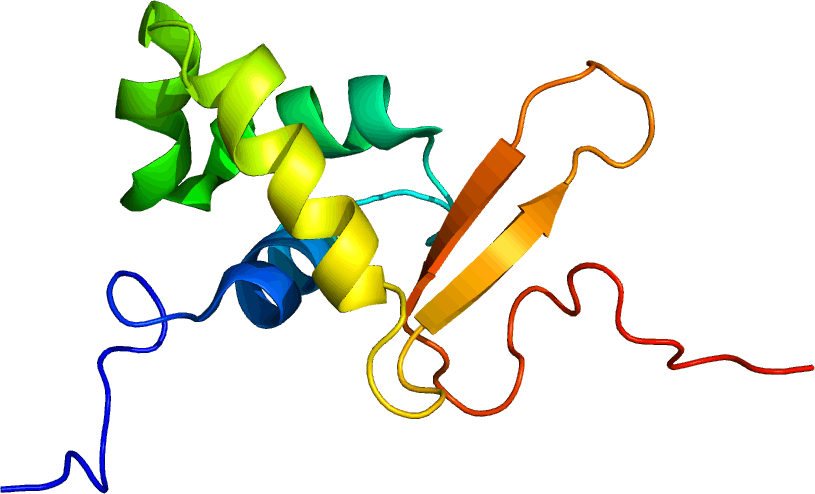

Identifiers
- Aliases: FOXO3, AF6q21, FKHRL1, FKHRL1P2, FOXO2, FOXO3A, forkhead box O3
- External IDs: OMIM: 602681; MGI: 1890081; GeneCards: FOXO3
Available structures
PDB	Ortholog search: PDBe RCSB
PDB	List of PDB id codes 2K86, 2LQH, 2LQI, 2UZK

Gene location (Human)
Chr.	Chromosome 6 (human)
Band	6q21	Start	108,559,835 bp
Band	6q21	End	108,684,774 bp

Gene location (Mouse)
Chr.	Chromosome 10 (mouse)
Band	10 B2|10 22.79 cM	Start	42,057,837 bp
Band	10 B2|10 22.79 cM	End	42,152,751 bp
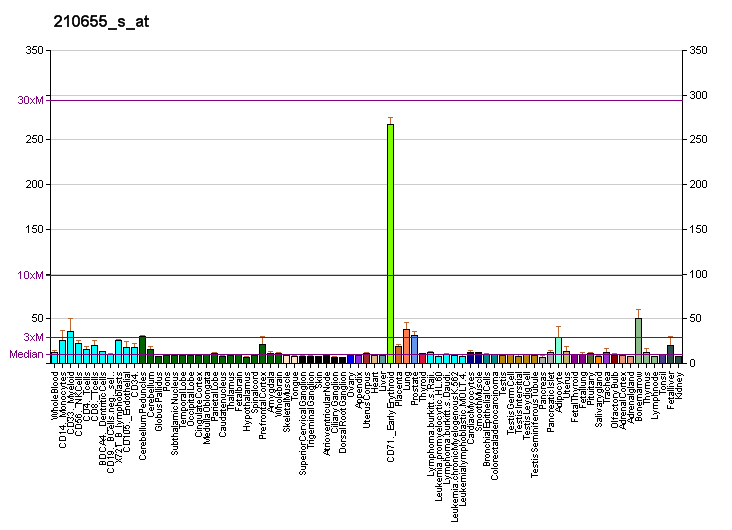

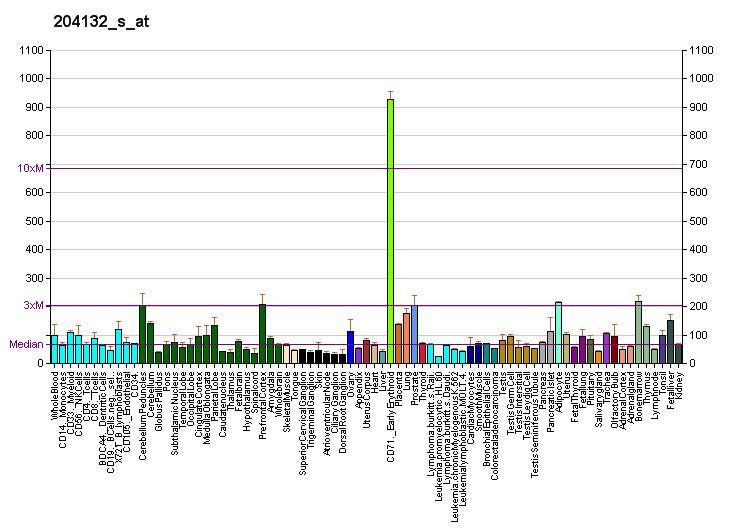

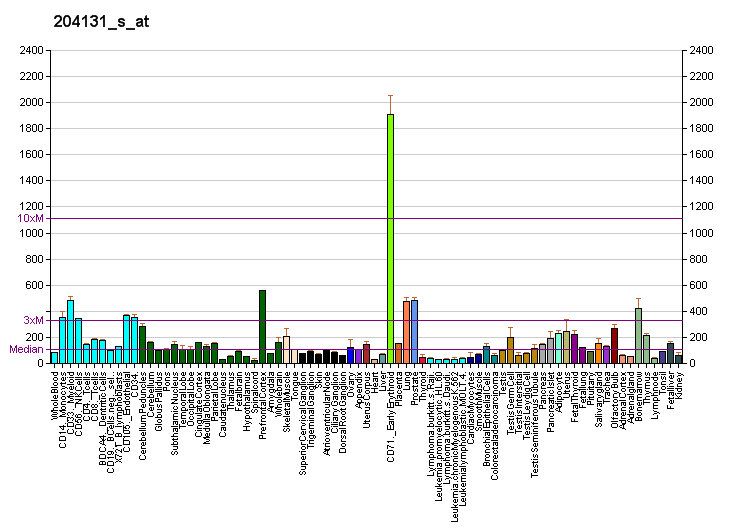
RNA expression pattern
Bgee	Human / Mouse (ortholog); Top expressed in: secondary oocyte; trabecular bone; cerebellar vermis; nipple; middle temporal gyrus; visceral pleura; buccal mucosa cell; tibialis anterior muscle; pericardium; parietal pleura / Top expressed in: secondary oocyte; zygote; fetal liver hematopoietic progenitor cell; primary oocyte; ciliary body; aortic valve; ascending aorta; cumulus cell; blood; fossa; More reference expression data
BioGPS	More reference expression data
Gene ontology
Molecular function	beta-catenin binding; DNA-binding transcription activator activity, RNA polymerase II-specific; protein binding; protein kinase binding; chromatin DNA binding; DNA-binding transcription factor activity; sequence-specific DNA binding; DNA binding; DNA-binding transcription repressor activity, RNA polymerase II-specific; DNA-binding transcription factor activity, RNA polymerase II-specific; mitochondrial transcription factor activity; transcription coregulator binding; RNA polymerase II cis-regulatory region sequence-specific DNA binding; transcription factor binding
Cellular component	membrane; nucleoplasm; cytosol; cytoplasm; nucleus; mitochondrion; mitochondrial outer membrane; mitochondrial matrix; protein-containing complex
Biological process	initiation of primordial ovarian follicle growth; ovulation from ovarian follicle; regulation of transcription, DNA-templated; antral ovarian follicle growth; positive regulation of erythrocyte differentiation; glucose homeostasis; DNA damage response, signal transduction by p53 class mediator; tumor necrosis factor-mediated signaling pathway; regulation of reactive oxygen species metabolic process; transcription by RNA polymerase II; regulation of neural precursor cell proliferation; transcription, DNA-templated; neuronal stem cell population maintenance; positive regulation of neuron apoptotic process; oocyte maturation; extrinsic apoptotic signaling pathway in absence of ligand; positive regulation of apoptotic process; regulation of translation; negative regulation of canonical Wnt signaling pathway; apoptotic process; negative regulation of transcription by RNA polymerase II; regulation of transcription by RNA polymerase II; positive regulation of transcription by RNA polymerase II; cellular response to oxidative stress; positive regulation of transcription, DNA-templated; positive regulation of reactive oxygen species biosynthetic process; brain morphogenesis; ageing; negative regulation of neuron differentiation; cellular response to hypoxia; response to water-immersion restraint stress; response to nutrient levels; cellular response to amyloid-beta; cellular response to corticosterone stimulus; positive regulation of endothelial cell apoptotic process; positive regulation of hydrogen peroxide-mediated programmed cell death; response to dexamethasone; cellular response to nerve growth factor stimulus; cellular response to glucose stimulus; anatomical structure morphogenesis; cytokine-mediated signaling pathway; mitochondrial transcription; negative regulation of cell migration; insulin receptor signaling pathway; positive regulation of autophagy; positive regulation of muscle atrophy; response to starvation
Sources:Amigo / QuickGO
Orthologs
Databases	NCBI: entry; OMA: entry
Species	Human	Mouse
Entrez	2309	56484
Ensembl	ENSG00000118689	ENSMUSG00000048756
UniProt	O43524	Q9WVH4
RefSeq (mRNA)	NM_001455; NM_201559	NM_019740; NM_001376967
RefSeq (protein)	NP_001446; NP_963853	NP_062714; NP_001363896
Location (UCSC)	Chr 6: 108.56 – 108.68 Mb	Chr 10: 42.06 – 42.15 Mb
PubMed search
- Wikidata
View/Edit Human	View/Edit Mouse

Forkhead box O3, also known as FOXO3 or FOXO3a, is a human protein encoded by the FOXO3 gene.

== Function ==
FOXO3 belongs to the O subclass of the forkhead family of transcription factors which are characterized by a distinct fork head DNA-binding domain. There are three other FoxO family members in humans, FOXO1, FOXO4 and FOXO6. These transcription factors share the ability to be inhibited and translocated out of the nucleus on phosphorylation by proteins such as Akt/PKB in the PI3K signaling pathway (aside from FOXO6, which may be constitutively nuclear). Other post-translational modifications including acetylation and methylation are seen and can result in increased or altered FOXO3a activity.

The use of FOXO3a knockout mice has revealed a diverse range of functions in both health and disease, namely infertility, lymphoproliferation, adenoma, organ inflammation, metabolism etc.; yet despite the purported importance of FOXO transcription factors in aging, FOXO3A knockout mice do not show an obvious shortening of lifespan or accelerated aging.

== Clinical significance ==
Deregulation of FOXO3a is involved in tumorigenesis, for example translocation of this gene with the MLL gene is associated with secondary acute leukemia. Downregulation of FOXO3a activity is often seen in cancer (e.g. by increase in Akt activity resulting from loss of PTEN). FOXO3 is known as a tumour suppressor.

Alternatively spliced transcript variants encoding the same protein have been observed.

The ketone body β-hydroxybutyrate has been shown in mice to increase gene expression of FOXO3a by histone deacetylase inhibition, upon which FOXO3a transcriptionally increased gene expression of the antioxidant enzymes SOD2 and catalase. Plasma levels of β-hydroxybutyrate increase with fasting or a ketogenic diet.

=== Apoptosis ===
Yu & Fellows et al. (2018) demonstrated that FOXO3a activation in vascular smooth muscle cells induces prominent apoptosis and extracellular matrix breakdown in vitro and exacerbates atherosclerosis and vascular remodelling in vivo. Also, these processes were at least partially dependent on MMP-13, as shown by siRNA knockdown and specific pharmacological inhibition. Further experiments also revealed MMP-13 as a novel, bona fide transcriptional target gene of FOXO3a in VSMCs.

FOXO3a also functions as a trigger for apoptosis through upregulation of genes necessary for cell death, such as Bim and PUMA, or downregulation of anti-apoptotic proteins such as FLIP.

=== Stem cells ===
It is thought that FOXO3a is also involved in protection from oxidative stress by upregulating antioxidants such as catalase and MnSOD. Ron DePinho's group generated Foxo3 knockout mice, and showed that female exhibit a dramatic age-dependent infertility, due to premature ovarian failure. Gopinath et al.,found that FOXO3 promotes quiescence of muscle stem cells during self-renewal in a Notch-dependent mechanism using muscle stem cell-specific conditional knock out mice.

=== Longevity ===
Genetic variation in FOXO3 has been shown to be associated with healthspan and longevity in humans. It is found in most centenarians across a variety of ethnic groups around the world. The homologous genes daf-16 in the nematode C. elegans and dFOXO in the fruit fly are also associated with longevity in those organisms. Mice lacking FOXO3 do not show obvious accelerated aging or shortened lifespan.

=== Association with intelligence ===
In a meta-analysis of 78,308 individuals of European descent, a particular single nucleotide polymorphism (SNP) (rs2490272) in an intronic region of FOXO3 and neighboring SNPs in the promoter region, had the strongest associations with intelligence. Various types of tests had been used to measure intelligence.

== See also ==
- FOX proteins
- Daf-16
