= Graham C. Walker =

American biologist (born 1948)

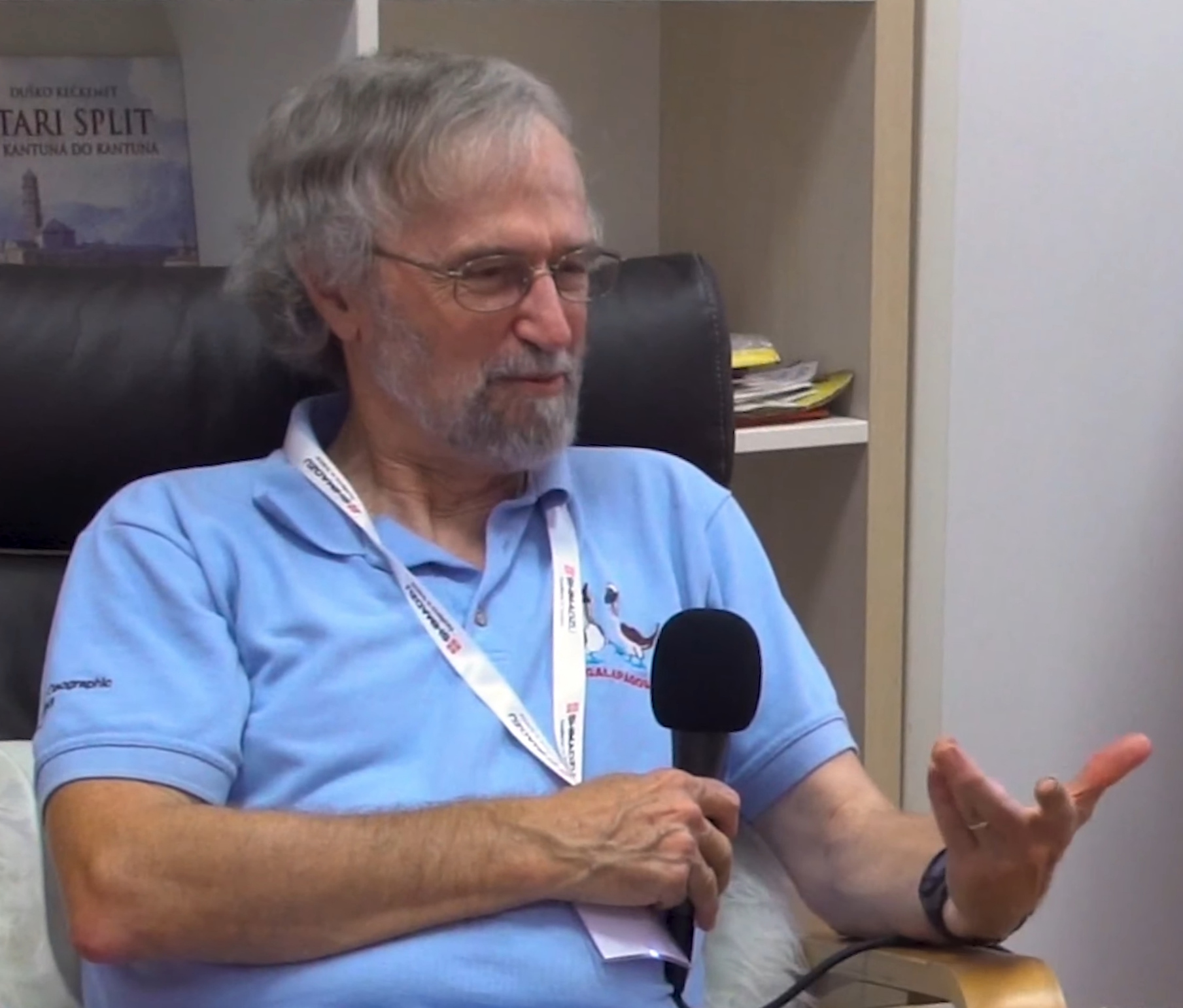
- Walker in 2019
- Education: Carleton University; University of Illinois
- Scientific career
- Workplaces: MIT
- Notable students: Cynthia Kenyon

Graham Charles Walker (born 1948) is an American biologist, notable for his work explicating the structure and function of proteins involved in DNA repair and mutagenesis, with applications for cancer, and for understanding rhizobium (bacterial) functions that infect plants and mammals.

In addition to his scientific achievements, Walker is coordinating a program at MIT to develop curricular materials in biology.

== Biography ==
Walker earned a B.Sc. degree from Carleton University, and his Ph.D. in 1974 from the University of Illinois. He did postdoctoral work at the University of Illinois and at University of California, Berkeley with Bruce Ames.

He is currently a professor at MIT.

== Notable publications ==
- Errol C. Friedberg, Graham C. Walker, Wolfram Siede, and Richard D. Wood, DNA Repair and Mutagenesis (2005 edition of notable textbook)
- Bradley T. Smith, Alan D. Grossman, and Graham C. Walker, "Visualization of Mismatch Repair in Bacterial Cells", Molecular Cell, v.8, pp. 1197–1206 (Dec. 2001)
- LeVier, K., Phillips, R.W., Grippe, V.K., Roop II, R.M. and Walker, G.C. Similar requirements of a plant symbiont and a mammalian pathogen for prolonged intracellular survival. Science 287:2492-2493 (2000)
- G. C. Walker, "Mutagenesis and inducible responses to deoxyribonucleic acid damage in Escheriscia coli", Microbiological Reviews (full text available at PubMed Central)

== Awards ==
- 1970 - Woodrow Wilson National Fellow
- 1978-1982 - Rita Allen Foundation Scholar
- 1994 - Elected Fellow, American Academy of Microbiology
- 2004 - Elected Fellow, American Academy of Arts and Sciences.
- 2006 - Environmental Mutagen Society Award
- 2009 - Elected Fellow, American Association for the Advancement of Science.
- 2013 - Elected Member, National Academy of Sciences.
- American Cancer Society Research Professor
- Charles Ross Scholar Award for Cancer Research
- Arthur C. Smith Award
- Stone Lectureship, Pennsylvania State University
