= Age-1 =

Gene

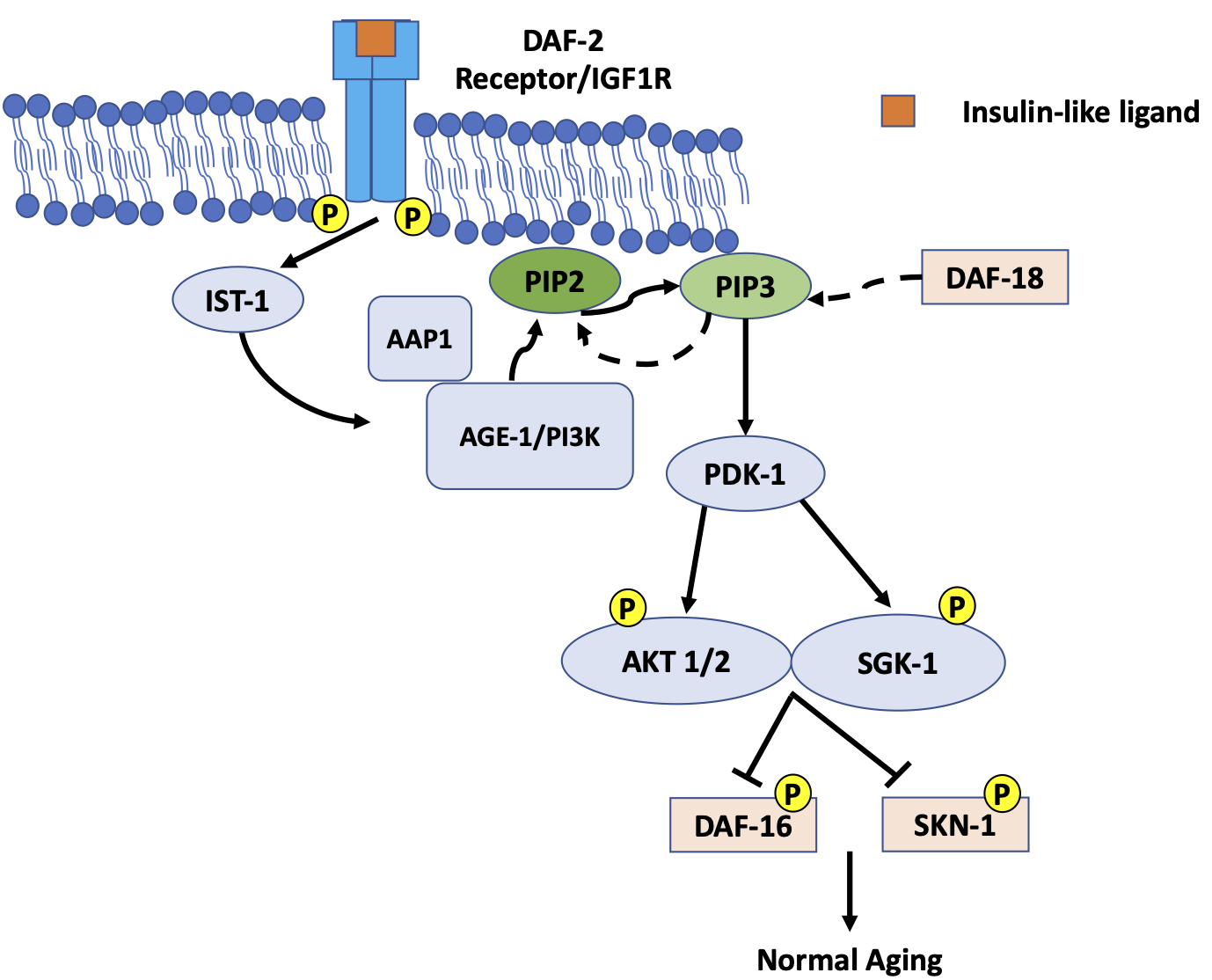
Schematic representation of C.elegans IIS pathway activation

The age-1 gene is located on chromosome 2 in C.elegans. It gained attention in 1983 for its ability to induce long-lived C. elegans mutants. The age-1 mutant, first identified by Michael Klass, was reported to extend mean lifespan by over 50% at 25 °C when compared to the wild type worm (N2) in 1987 by Johnson et al. Development, metabolism, lifespan, among other processes have been associated with age-1 expression. The age-1 gene is known to share a genetic pathway with daf-2 gene that regulates lifespan in worms. Additionally, both age-1 and daf-2 mutants are dependent on daf-16 and daf-18 genes to promote lifespan extension.

Long-lived age-1 mutants are resistant to oxidative stress and UV light. Age-1 mutants also have a higher DNA repair capability than wild-type C. elegans. Knockdown of the nucleotide excision repair gene Xpa-1 increases sensitivity to UV and reduces the life span of the long-lived mutants. These findings support the hypothesis that DNA repair capability underlies longevity.

== Insulin/IGF-1 signaling (IIS) pathway ==
The age-1 gene is said to encode for AGE-1, the catalytic subunit ortholog to phosphoinositide 3-kinase in C.elegans, which plays an important role in the insulin/IGF-1(IIS) signaling pathway. This pathway gets activated upon binding of an insulin-like peptide to the DAF-2/IGF1R receptor. Binding causes dimerization and phosphorylation of the receptor, which induces recruitment of the DAF-2 receptor substrate IST-1. Subsequently, IST-1 promotes activation of both AGE-1/PI3K and its adaptor subunit AAP-1. AGE-1 then induces conversion of phosphatidylinositol 4,5-bisphosphate (PIP_{2}) to phosphatidylinositol-3,4,5-triphosphate (PIP_{3}). This conversion can be reversed by DAF-18 (PTEN in humans). PIP_{3} causes activation of its major effector PDK-1, which in turn promotes phosphorylation of AKT 1/2, and SGK-1. This phosphorylation causes inhibition of the transcription factor DAF-16/FoXO and glucocorticoid-inducible kinase-1(SKN-1), preventing the expression of downstream genes involved in longevity. In other words, activation of the IIS pathway blocks expression of genes known to extend lifespan by preventing DAF-16 from translocating to the nucleus and activating them.

== History ==
The age-1 gene was first characterized by Thomas Johnson as a follow up study to Michael Klass's findings on the isolation of long-lived C. elegans mutants. Johnson demonstrated that long-lived age-1 (hx546) mutants did not have significant differences in growth rate or development. Additionally, all age-1 isolates were also fer-15 (mutants sensitive to temperature), suggesting that both genes were inherited together. This result suggested that the age phenotype was caused by a single mutation. Johnson proposed a negative pleiotropy theory, in which the age-1 gene is beneficial early in life but harmful at a later stage, on the basis that the long-lived mutants had decreased self-fertility compared to controls. This theory was contradicted in 1993 by Johnson himself when he ablated the fertility defect on the mutant, and the animals still lived long. After the age-1 gene was discovered, Cynthia Kenyon published groundbreaking research on doubling the lifespan of C. elegans by the insulin/IGF-1 pathway. The age-1 gene plays a pivotal role in the IGF-1 pathway and encodes the homolog of phosphatidylinositol-3-OH kinase (PI3K) catalytic subunits in mammals.

== See also ==
- Unfolded protein response
- Genetics of aging
