= Alae (nematode anatomy) =

Longitudinal protruding ridge on many nematodes

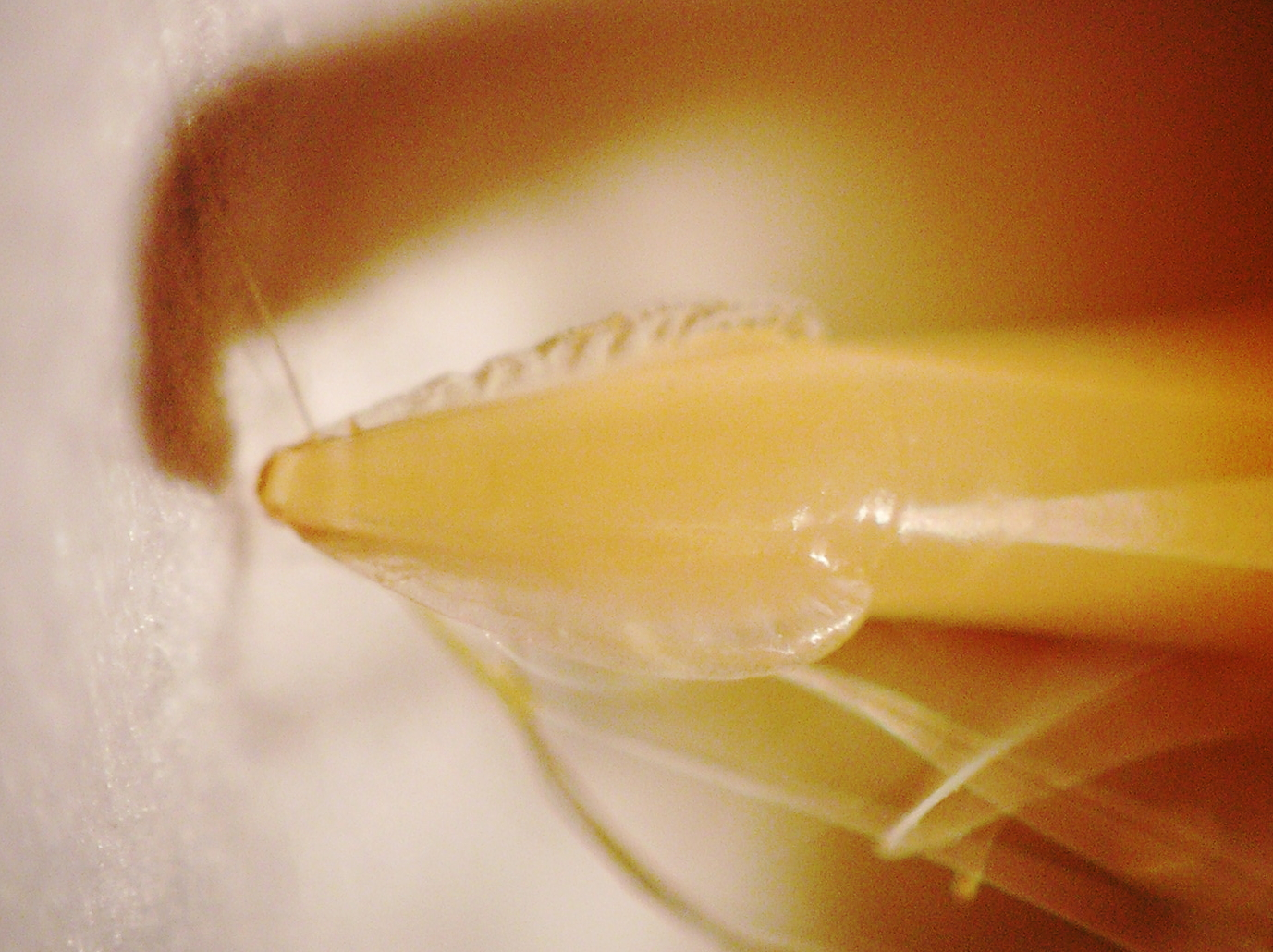
Cervical alae of head of Toxocara cati

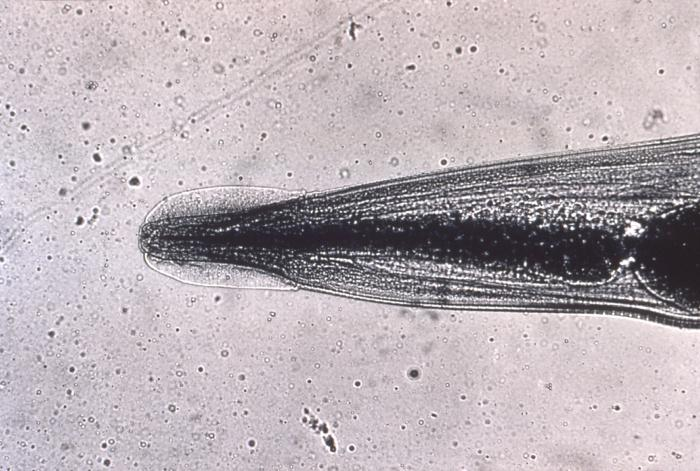
Cephalic alae of head of Enterobius vermicularis (human pinworm)

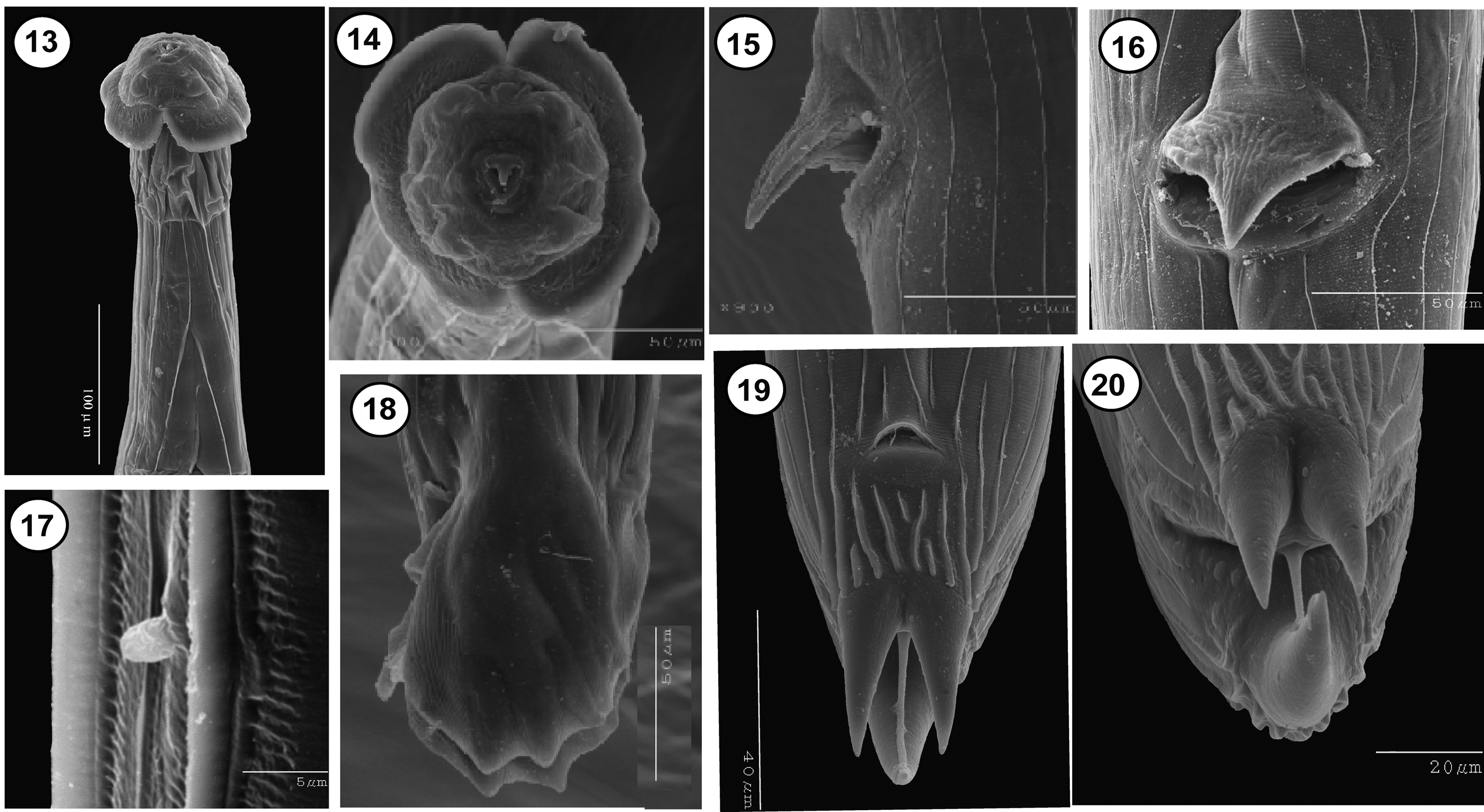
18: Lateral view of caudal bursa, showing projections supported by bursal rays.

The alae is a protruding ridge that forms longitudinally on many nematodes. In the Caenorhabditis elegans nematode they are present in the L1, dauer (an alternative long living larvae stage where the nematode is dormant) and adult stages. The alae are most pronounced during the dauer larval stage and not present in the L2, and L3 C. elegans stages.

The term ‘alae’ is the plural of ala (wing), describing either one of the pair of ridges that forms on a nematode or an individual crease found on an individual ridge. The term ‘ala’ is rarely used in describing the alae and scientific journals use the term ‘alae’ both singularly and in the plural.

== Structure ==
The alae is formed by the hypodermal seam cells where a fibrous ribbon of a zona pellucida (ZP) domain protein is produced. In C. elegans many of these proteins are termed CUT-1. The CUT refers to cuticulins which are the various proteins that are not solubilised by both reducing agents and detergents made insoluble by the nature of their crosslinks.

Described as a matrix that appears to be holding the two sides of the collagenous cuticle together for strengthening it should also be interpreted as a matrix separating the cuticle thereby exposing itself to the external environment. The alae is formed during an oxidative process where peroxidase acts on protein bound tyrosine residues. The alae is a crease, that by the cross linking process causes radial shrinking of the seam cell secreted proteins.

== Function ==
The function of the alae is not yet clear. It is generally given a function related to cuticle strength, nematode movement or fat storage. But the predominant structure of the C. elegans alae contain the ZP domain proteins (CUT-1, CUT-3, CUT-5). The ZP domain had been termed ‘the sequence in search of a function’ and has been given the functional role of matrix assembly and also putatively, functions in pheromone and olfactory signal transduction. Despite the structural nature of the ZP domain, it is not the ideal protein for strength alone. Wherever ZP domains are found, they are found in definite or putative association with signal transduction accompanied by interaction with an external or hostile environment.

=== Function based on genetic data of the H. Contortus dauer nematode ===
In the parasitic nematode Haemonchus contortus a ZP domain protein of a dauer stage nematode has been genetically associated to a target molecule found in the environment that this nematode could be using for exiting the dauer stage. This was statistically related with a high degree of significance indicating that the alae may specifically function as a receptor site.

In the case of H. contortus the dauer nematode can remain in the gastric epithelium for months and until the right signals indicating conditions outside the host are favorable for egg survival, it will then trigger resumption of development. During the dauer stage the mouth and anal openings are sealed and neural receptors around the head retracted. The alae is more pronounced than at any other stage and remains exposed to the external environment. Triggers for exiting the dauer state may be determined by the concentration of target molecules around the nematode. In order to measure concentrations accurately, a very large receptor area is necessary, hence a structure such as the alae may be required.

=== Postulated function ===
The alae appears to be a neural receptor responsive to just a handful of molecules particular to each species of nematode. Up to half a dozen types of receptors may be present at any one time on the alae and each type would be very numerous. The target molecules in the environment that stimulate each type of receptor may then be measured for their concentration and a threshold reached before an action is instigated. These actions may instigate entry into the dauer state (L1 alae), exiting of the dauer state (pheromone and or presence of an indicator for food availability), for sexual reproduction where the area around the vulva and gonads of the female and male use this family of receptors (RAM-5) where the nematode is likely to identify that reproductive organs are in contact. And quite probably there are some other functions that we have not yet been found.
