= Daf-12 =

Nuclear hormone receptor family member daf-12

Identifiers
- Organism: Caenorhabditis elegans
- Symbol: daf-12
- Alt. symbols: NR1J1
- Entrez: 181263
- RefSeq (mRNA): NM_001029376.5
- RefSeq (Prot): NP_001024547.1
- UniProt: G5EFF5

Other data
- Chromosome: X: 10.64 - 10.67 Mb
Search for
- Structures: Swiss-model
- Domains: InterPro

The DAF-12 (abnormal dauer formation protein 12) gene encodes the nuclear receptor of dafachronic acid (a steroid hormone) in the worm Caenorhabditis elegans, with the NRNC Symbol NR1J1 as the homolog of nuclear hormone receptor HR96 (Hr96) in Drosophila melanogaster. DAF-12 has been implicated by Cynthia Kenyon and colleagues in the formation of Dauer larva.

In favorable environments, a cytochrome p450 Daf-9 (Cyp22a1) produce dafachronic acid to binding Daf-12 to initiating downstream gene expression. When in unfavorable environments, like starvation, dafachronic acid decreases, Daf-12 will form a complex with co-repressor DIN-1.
