= Andrew Dillin =

American professor of biology

- Education: UC Berkeley; University of California, San Francisco
- Scientific career
- Workplaces: UC Berkeley
- Doctoral advisor: Cynthia Kenyon

Andrew George Dillin is a Howard Hughes Medical Investigator and the Thomas and Stacey Siebel Distinguished Chair in Stem Cell Research at the Department of Molecular and Cell Biology at Berkeley. His lab studies the loss of protein homeostasis in aging, particularly in Caenorhabditis elegans.

His lab specifically looks at the manipulation of stress response pathways, such as the heat shock response and the unfolded protein response of the mitochondria and the endoplasmic reticulum. In particular, his lab found a cell non-autonomous mitochondrial stress response that can be transmitted to distal cells.
