= Nematocida parisii =

Scientific classification
- Kingdom: Fungi
- Division: Microsporidia
- Genus: Nematocida
- Species: N. parisii

Binomial name
- Nematocida parisii Troemel, Félix, Whiteman, Barrière & Ausubel, 2008

Species of microsporidian

Nematocida parisii is a parasitic species of Microsporidia fungi found in wild isolates of the common nematode, Caenorhabditis elegans. The fungus forms spores and replicates in the intestines before leaving the host.

== Infection ==
Nematocida parisii is an intracellular parasite that is transmitted from one animal to another, most commonly through the fecal–oral route. Once it gets into the intestines, it forms small, ovoid microbes that become spores and leave holes in the intestinal wall. The spores are believed to exit cells by disrupting a conserved cytoskeletal structure in the intestine called the terminal web.

None of the known immune pathways of C. elegans appear to be involved in mediating resistance against N. parisii. Microsporidia have been found in several nematodes isolated from different locations, indicating that they are common natural parasites of C. elegans. The N. parisii–C. elegans system is a useful tool for studying infection mechanisms of intracellular parasites.

== Anatomy ==
Nematocida parisii has two life stages: the spore stage and the meront stage. The spores have a bulky cell wall to help them live outside the host cell during transmission, as well as a polar tube that aids in the infection of the host cell. The tube helps the sporoplasm turn itself inside out in order to get close enough to the host cell to infect it. The sporoplasm becomes the merit, which then becomes more spores after infection within the host cell. Once the spores have matured, they can be released to infect another host. Because its genome size is small and it has very few metabolic pathways, N. parisii needs its host to survive.

== Related species ==
In 2016, a new species of microsporidia was found in a wild-caught C. elegans. Genome sequencing placed it in the same genus, Nematocida, as prior microsporidia seen in these nematodes. The new species, named Nematocida displodere, was shown to infect a broad range of tissues and cell types in C. elegans, including the epidermis, muscle, neurons, intestine, seam cells, and coelomocytes.

These related species are being used to study the host and pathogen mechanisms responsible for allowing or blocking eukaryotic parasite growth in different tissue niches.

== See also ==
- Host–microbe interactions in Caenorhabditis elegans
- Intestinal parasite
