= Nematocida =

Scientific classification
- Kingdom: Fungi
- Division: Microsporidia
- Genus: Nematocida

Species
- Nematocida displodere; Nematocida parisii

Genus of microsporidians

Nematocida is a genus of Microsporidia fungi. One species, N. parisii, is found in wild isolates of Caenorhabditis elegans. This species replicates in the intestines of C. elegans.
