= Coleen T. Murphy =

American geneticist

- Education: University of Houston; Stanford University
- Known for: Studies of aging mechanisms using C. elegans as a model
- Scientific career
- Fields: Genomics
- Workplaces: Princeton University
- Doctoral advisor: James Spudich
- Other academic advisors: Cynthia Kenyon

Coleen T. Murphy is a geneticist and Richard B. Fisher Preceptor in Integrative Genomics Professor of Molecular Biology at the Lewis-Sigler Institute for Integrative Genomics at Princeton University. She is director of the Paul F. Glenn Laboratories For Aging Research at Princeton.

== Education ==
Murphy completed a B.S. with honors in biochemical and biophysical sciences at the University of Houston and earned a Ph.D. at Stanford University with James A. Spudich as her advisor. She was awarded a graduate fellowship at Howard Hughes Medical Institute and completed her postdoctoral work at the University of California, San Francisco.

== Research interests ==
Murphy's lab at Princeton focuses on identifying transcriptional targets related to longevity, using the roundworm Caenorhabditis elegans as a model. Early in her career, Murphy and her postdoctoral mentor Cynthia Kenyon determined that by deactivating one C. elegans gene, called "daf-2", the worms' life expectancy doubled and they expressed a delayed senescence, showing marked behavioral improvements in long-term memory, working memory, and navigational capabilities as compared to the control. The specific longevity genes she is interested in relate to communication between different types of tissue. Once these genetic pathways in different tissue types are identified, they can be monitored in vitro in C. elegans. Since many of the genetic pathways in C. elegans are comparable to those in other organisms, including a 40% overlap with the human genome, Murphy's work is providing a better understanding of how genes related to longevity in humans express themselves, and how the breakdown of communication pathways between tissues during aging occurs. Murphy's lab developed a new suite of techniques that allow for localized tissue sampling, allowing research into these differentiated signal pathways in various tissue types within the same organism to take place.

Based on the success of her early work, the National Institutes of Health awarded Murphy a NIH Pioneer Award in 2015. In 2016, Murphy was selected as a faculty scholar by the Howard Hughes Medical Institute. Murphy was elected a Fellow of the American Association for the Advancement of Science in 2023.
