= Dafachronic acid =

Δ4-Dafachronic acid

Δ7-Dafachronic acid
(dafachronic acid A)

Dafachronic acids are steroid hormones that activate the nuclear receptor Daf-12/NR1J1 in Caenorhabditis elegans and related organisms, including Δ4-dafachronic acid and Δ7-dafachronic acid. Both are generated by Daf-9/CYP22A1 from respective precursors.
