= Phosphorylation cascade =

Signal pathway enzyme chain

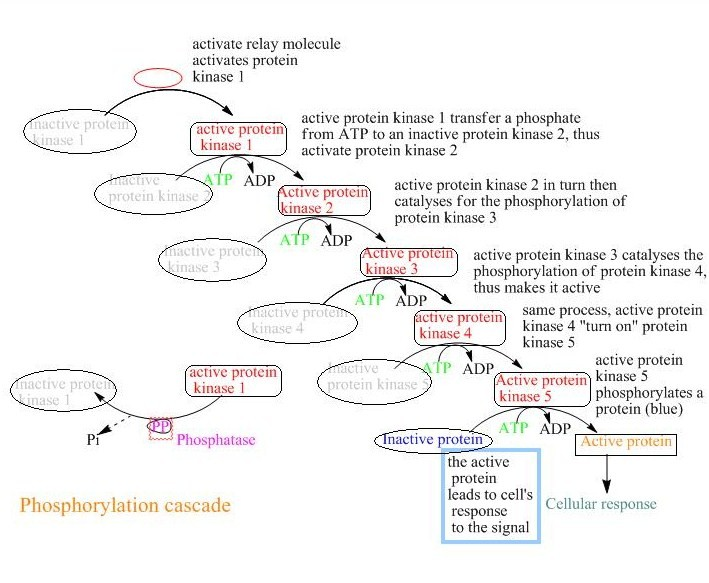
Phosphorylation and dephosphorylation summary

A phosphorylation cascade is a sequence of signaling pathway events where one enzyme phosphorylates another, causing a chain reaction leading to the phosphorylation of thousands of proteins. This can be seen in signal transduction of hormone messages. A signaling pathway begins at the cell surface where a hormone or protein binds to a receptor at the extracellular matrix. The interactions between the molecule and receptor cause a conformational change at the receptor, which activates multiple enzymes or proteins. These enzymes activate secondary messengers, which leads to the phosphorylation of thousands of proteins. The end product of a phosphorylation cascade is the changes occurring inside the cell. These cascades work to amplify the signal where binding of one extracellular ligand can activate thousands of proteins downstream since these are allosterically regulated enzymes that make many products, amplifying the signal.

== MAP/ERK Phosphorylation Cascade ==
An example of a signaling pathway that uses phosphorylation cascades is with the activation of mitogen-activated protein (MAP) kinase or ERK kinase. To activate this kinase, an epidermal growth factor must bind to the epidermal growth factor receptor at the extracellular domain, causing a conformational change to the receptor tyrosine kinase that activates it and results in dimerization and autophosphorylation of intracellular tyrosine residues. This allows for the binding of the adaptor protein GRB2 with its SH2 domain, which recognizes the phosphorylated tyrosines. A pair of SH3 domains on the adaptor protein will recruit the SOS protein by recognition of proline-containing consensus sequences. SOS will subsequently act as a GEF protein to catalyze the exchange of GDP to GTP on the Ras GTPase. Activated Ras-GTP now activates the Raf Kinase enzyme which will phosphorylate MEK enzymes, which in turn phosphorylate MAP/ERK kinases, which continue to phosphorylate other enzymes to regulate their activity and lead to regulation of gene expression. MAP kinase not only plays an important function during growth of cell in the M phase phosphorylation cascade but also plays an important role during the sequence of signaling pathway. In order to regulate its functions so it does not cause chaos, it can only be active when both tyrosine and threonine/serine residues are phosphorylated.

== Cancer ==
Tumor cells may possess mutations in key receptors related to cell division and growth. A loss in the ability to properly regulate these receptors and the phosphorylation cascades they result in is deleterious to the organism. Fibroblast growth factors (FGF) bind to their fibroblast growth factor receptors (FGFR) and lead to activation of multiple signaling pathways by phosphorylation cascades to result in proliferation, differentiation and survival of the cell. Mutations or gene fusions with these receptors leads to a loss of regulation of the intracellular enzymes, resulting in excessive proliferation which drives tumor growth. Similarly, vascular endothelial growth factors (VEGF) bind to their vascular endothelial growth factor receptors (VEGFR) leads to activation of similar pathways along with those that lead to increased vessel permeability and angiogenesis. This is normally regulated by hypoxic conditions, but cancer cells can bypass this to stimulate vessel growth when not appropriate to aid in tumor growth. Targeting and inhibiting these receptors and they cascades they initiate has been an effective means of battling some cancers and even with its great developments is a very active area of research.
