= Daf-2 =

Protein-coding gene in the species Caenorhabditis elegans

abnormal dauer formation protein 2

Identifiers
- Organism: Caenorhabditis elegans
- Symbol: daf-2
- Entrez: 175410
- RefSeq (mRNA): NM_065249.5
- RefSeq (Prot): NP_497650.4
- UniProt: Q968Y9

Other data
- Chromosome: III: 2.99 - 3.03 Mb
Search for
- Structures: Swiss-model
- Domains: InterPro

The DAF-2 gene encodes for the insulin-like growth factor 1 (IGF-1) receptor in the worm Caenorhabditis elegans. DAF-2 is part of the first metabolic pathway discovered to regulate the rate of aging. DAF-2 is also known to regulate reproductive development, resistance to oxidative stress, thermotolerance, resistance to hypoxia, and resistance to bacterial pathogens. Mutations in DAF-2 and also Age-1 have been shown by Cynthia Kenyon to double the lifespan of the worms. In a 2007 episode of WNYC’s Radiolab, Kenyon called DAF-2 "the grim reaper gene.”

== Long-lived mutants ==
Long-lived DAF-2 C. elegans mutants are resistant to the oxidizing agent paraquat and to UV light. DAF-2 mutants also have a higher DNA repair capability than wild-type C. elegans. Knockdown of the nucleotide excision repair gene Xpa-1 increases sensitivity to UV and reduces the life span of the long-lived mutants. These findings support the hypothesis that DNA damage has a significant role in the aging process.

== IGF-1 signal pathway ==
Insulin/IGF-1-like signaling is well-conserved evolutionarily across animal phyla, from single celled organisms to mammals. DAF-2 is the only member of the insulin receptor family in C. elegans but it corresponds, in form and function, to multiple pathways in humans. The protein predicted from DAF-2's sequence is 35% identical to the human insulin receptor, which regulates metabolism; 34% identical to the IGF-1 receptor, which regulates growth; and 33% identical to the human insulin receptor–related receptor. In C. elegans, the insulin/IGF-1/FOXO pathway is initiated by changes in IGF-1 levels which cause IGF-1 receptors to start a phosphorylation cascade that deactivates the FOXO transcription factor, DAF-16. When not phosphorylated, DAF-16 is active and present in the nucleus. DAF-16 is responsible for up-regulating transcription of about 100 genes that code for cell protecting products such as heat shock proteins and antioxidants. Genetic analysis reveals that the presence of functioning DAF-16 is required to produce the extended lifespan observed in DAF-2 knock-downs. By silencing DAF-16, activation of DAF-2 receptors can ultimately compromise a cell’s ability to mitigate harmful environmental conditions. In most eukaryotes, insulin activates DAF-2 signaling. However, both human insulin and insulin coded for by orthologous genes in C. elegans inhibit DAF-2 receptors in C. elegans.

== Role in C. elegans developmental stages ==
Caenorhabditis elegans, which progresses through a series of larval stages into a final reproductive adult, may instead enter a less metabolically active dauer diapause stage if food scarcity or overcrowding occurs before reaching adulthood. Disabling DAF-2 arrests development in the dauer stage which increases longevity, delays senescence and prevents reproductive maturity.

== Diet’s interaction with the IGF-1 pathway ==
Research into the interaction between diet and the insulin/IGF-1 pathway has shown sugar intake to be negatively correlated with DAF-16 activity and longevity. One study found that glucose ingestion reduced the rate of dauer formation and shortened the life-spans of DAF-2 knock-downs to resemble that of normal C. elegans, suggesting that DAF-16 mediated gene expression associated with longevity is suppressed by glucose ingestion. Wild type C. elegans fed a diet that included 2% glucose showed reduced Daf-16 activity and lifespan was shortened by 20% compared to worms fed on glucose-free media. These findings raise the possibility that a low-sugar diet might have beneficial effects on life span in higher organisms.

== See also ==
- Unfolded protein response
- Genetics of aging
