= Daf-16 =

Ortholog

	DAF-16
	Crystalline structure of the protein FOXO, encoded by Daf-16
Gene	DAF-16
Protein	FOXO
Location	Chromosome 1
Position	175-268
Organism	Caenorhabditis elegans

DAF-16 is the sole ortholog of the FOXO family of transcription factors in the nematode Caenorhabditis elegans. It is responsible for activating genes involved in longevity, lipogenesis, heat shock survival and oxidative stress responses. It also protects C.elegans during food deprivation, causing it to transform into a hibernation - like state, known as a Dauer. DAF-16 is notable for being the primary transcription factor required for the profound lifespan extension observed upon mutation of the insulin-like receptor DAF-2. The gene has played a large role in research into longevity and the insulin signalling pathway as it is located in C. elegans, a successful ageing model organism.

== Genetics ==
DAF-16 is a gene conserved across species, with homologs being found in C. elegans, humans, mice, and Drosophila (fruit flies). In C. elegans, DAF-16 is located on Chromosome 1, at position 175-268. It is made up of 15 exons. DAF-16 is also located downstream of DAF-2, which signals in the IIS pathway. Mutants in this pathway age slower and have a lifespan up to twice as long as normal. Further studies have demonstrated that the lifespan extension is dependent on DAF-16. Other consequences of mutations in the DAF-16 gene is the inability to form dauers.

== Forkhead box protein O ==
DAF-16 encodes forkhead box protein O (FOXO), which binds to gene promoters that contain the sequence TTGTTTAC in their regulatory region – this is the DAF-16 binding element (DBE). FOXO is involved in the Insulin / IGF1 signalling pathway (IIS) which affects longevity, lipogenesis, dauer formation, heat shock and oxidative stress responses, by activating proteins such as MnSOD and Catalase. Expression of FOXO in the intestine normally leads to longevity signalling. FOXO has been shown to have a protective role against cancer, as it regulates and suppresses genes involved in tumour formation. It also has a protective role against muscular dystrophy. FOXO is also important in embryonic development, as it promotes apoptosis.

== Insulin signalling ==
Insulin and IGF1 are peptide hormones dictating energy functions such as glucose and lipid metabolism. The signalling pathway is evolutionary conserved and found across species. Signalling occurs through kinases such as PI3K to produce phospholipid products such as AKT. This causes downstream phosphorylation of targets such as DAF-16 by a phosphorylation cascade, blocking nuclear entry. Therefore, a reduction in insulin signalling generally leads to an increase in FOXO expression, as DAF-16 is no longer inhibited by AKT. When not phosphorylated, DAF-16 is active and present in the nucleus, so FOXO can be transcribed and can up-regulate production of about 100 beneficial proteins that increase longevity.

== Species, tissue, subcellular distribution ==
C. elegans is the only known species to contain the DAF-16 gene, although orthologs are conserved across species. DAF-16 may localise to the nucleus or cytoplasm, depending on resources. In nutrient rich conditions, DAF-2 and AKT-1/AKT-2 in the insulin pathway inhibits entry of DAF-16 to the nucleus as it is phosphorylated. However starvation, heat and oxidative stress inhibit phosphorylation by AKT and allow the localisation of DAF-16 to the nucleus. DAF-16 is sequestered in the cytoplasm when associated with ftt-2. Translocation to the nucleus and translation of longevity genes occurs after DAF-16 associates with prmpt-1 Translocation to the nucleus is also promoted by jnk-1 in heat stress and sek-1 in oxidative stress.

Expression

Isoform b and Isoform c are expressed in muscles, ectoderm, the intestine and neurons. Isoform b is additionally expressed in the pharynx. Expression can be induced by quinic acid.

== Clinical significance ==
Implication in Aging

DAF-16 is necessary for dauer formation and the protection of C. elegans during periods of starvation, as DAF-16, DAF-18 and DAF-12 loss - of - function mutants lose the ability to form dauers. A 2003 study by Murphy et al. showed the significance of DAF-16 for longevity, as it up-regulates genes involved in lifespan extension such as stress response genes and down regulates specific life-shortening genes. It has been proven that telomeres have an implication in the aging process, and in C. elegans the lifespan - extending effect of long telomeres is dependent on DAF-16. DAF-2 mutations more than double the lifespan of C. elegans, and this effect is dependent on the activity of DAF-16 as it encodes a member of the hepatocyte nuclear family 3 (HNF3)/ Forkhead family of transcription factors.

C. elegans has long been used in aging research. Although DAF-16 increases longevity, treating C.elegans with resveratrol extends lifespan in a method independent of DAF-16 and fully dependent on SIR2.1.

== Interactions ==
DAF-16 is known to interact with:

- RLE-1
- PRMT-1
- UNC-43
- TAX-6
- JNK-1
- FTT-2

== History ==
In 1963 Sydney Brenner realised the success of biology was due to model organisms, and C. elegans has been widely used in research laboratories since. In 1998 the genome of C. elegans was completely sequenced and found to be a 97 megabase genomic sequence consisting of 19,000 genes, with 40% protein products having significant matches in other organisms. The DAF genes DAF-2 and DAF-16 were discovered in the Thomas and Ruvkun labs, after isolating dauer-constitutive (DAF-c) mutants and dauer - defective mutants (DAF-d). Mutations in DAF-2 and DAF-23 caused the dauer - constitutive phenotype, through activation of the dauer - defective genes DAF-16 and DAF-18. This showed that DAF-2 and DAF-23 prevent dauer arrest by antagonising DAF-16 and DAF-18

Notable scientists involved in the initial and continued characterization of DAF-16-associated aging pathways:

- Cynthia Kenyon
- Gary Ruvkun

== See also ==
- FOX proteins
