= Cynthia Kenyon =

US molecular biologist

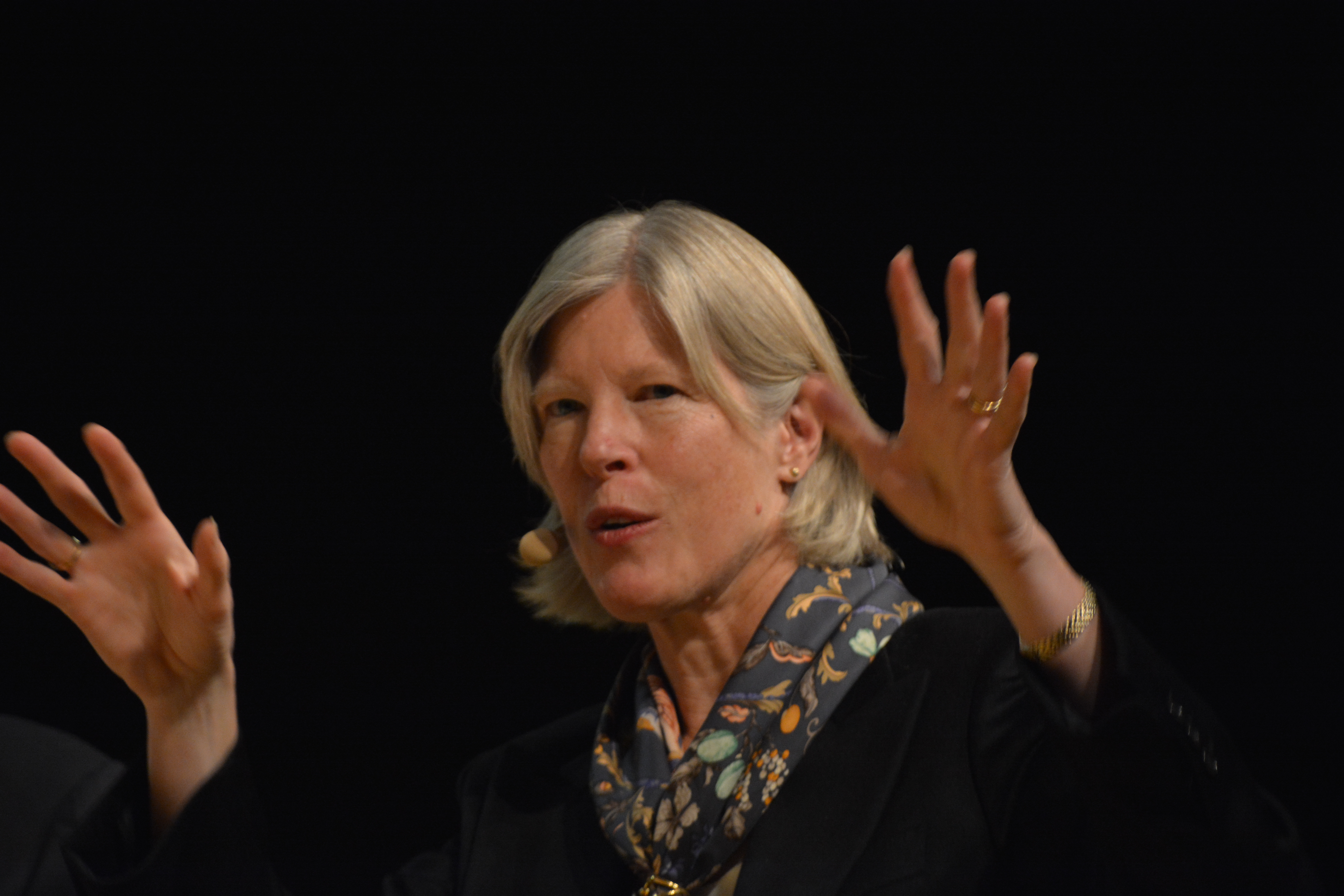
- Kenyon in 2014
- Born: February 21, 1954 (age 72)
- Education: Massachusetts Institute of Technology
- Known for: Aging in C. elegans
- Awards: Dan David Prize; Dickson Prize
- Scientific career
- Fields: Biologist
- Workplaces: Calico Life Sciences, LLC; Professor emeritus University of California San Francisco (UCSF) MRC Laboratory of Molecular Biology
- Doctoral advisor: Graham C. Walker
- Notable students: Coleen T. Murphy; Andrew Dillin

Cynthia Jane Kenyon (born February 21, 1954) is an American molecular biologist and biogerontologist known for her genetic dissection of aging in a widely used model organism, the roundworm Caenorhabditis elegans. She is the vice president of aging research at Calico Research Labs and emeritus professor of biochemistry and biophysics at the University of California, San Francisco (UCSF).

== Career ==
In 1976, Kenyon graduated from the University of Georgia as Valedictorian, earning bachelor's degrees in chemistry and biochemistry.

In 1981, Kenyon received her Ph.D. from MIT, where she worked in Graham Walker's laboratory. Her doctoral research used gene-expression profiles to identify a set of genes in E. coli that are activated in response to DNA-damaging agents.

From 1982 to 1986, Kenyon conducted postdoctoral research with Nobel laureate Sydney Brenner at the MRC Laboratory of Molecular Biology in Cambridge, England, where she studied the development of C. elegans. In 1986, she joined the faculty of the University of California, San Francisco.

Since 1986, Kenyon has been at UCSF, where she was the Herbert Boyer Distinguished Professor of Biochemistry and Biophysics and is now an American Cancer Society Professor.

In 1993, Kenyon discovered that a single-gene mutation in daf-2 could double the lifespan of C. elegans, and that this could be reversed by a second mutation in daf-16. Kenyon and her collaborators have since extended the lifespan of the worm C. elegans by as much as sixfold with further manipulation of the insulin/IGF-I pathway.

In 1999, Kenyon co-founded Elixir Pharmaceuticals with Leonard Guarente to try to discover and develop drugs that would slow down the process that makes people age.

Beginning in November 2013, Kenyon served as a part-time advisor at Calico, a new company focused on health, well-being, and longevity. In April 2014, Kenyon was named Vice President of Aging Research at Calico, although Kenyon remains affiliated with UCSF as an emeritus professor.

=== Genetic discoveries ===
Beginning in 1986, Kenyon's early work helped establish that Hox genes, previously characterized through their role in patterning the segmented body of Drosophila, also control body patterning in the unsegmented nematode C. elegans. In 1988, Kenyon and her collaborators showed that the C. elegans patterning gene mab-5 contains a homeobox homologous to that of the Drosophila Hox gene Antennapedia. These findings contributed to the recognition that Hox genes form an evolutionarily ancient system for patterning the bodies of diverse animals.

Kenyon's 1993 lifespan discovery sparked an intensive study of the molecular biology of aging, including work by Leonard Guarente and David Sinclair.

Kenyon's findings helped establish that evolutionarily conserved signaling pathways regulate lifespan across the animal kingdom.

== Awards and honors ==
- 1997 Member, American Academy of Arts and Sciences
- 2000 King Faisal Prize for Medicine
- 2003 Member, United States National Academy of Sciences
- 2003 President, Genetics Society of America
- 2004 Association of American Medical Colleges Award for Distinguished Research
- 2005 Ilse & Helmut Wachter Award for Exceptional Scientific Achievement
- 2006 La Fondation IPSEN Prize in Longevity
- 2008 AARP Inspire Award
- 2011 Dan David Prize for the Future – Aging: Facing the Challenge
- 2021 Dickson Prize in Medicine.

== Personal diet ==
Kenyon's research prompted her to make personal dietary changes. In 2000, when she discovered that putting sugar on the worms' food shortened their lifespans, she stopped eating high glycemic index carbohydrates and started eating a low-carbohydrate diet. She briefly experimented with a calorie restriction diet for two days, but couldn't stand the constant hunger. She chooses not to take any pills or supplements to prolong her life due to the lack of clinical trials for many of them.

== Bibliography ==
- Old World: Project Syndicate's Special Supplement on Aging ASIN B005NZ5BM4
- The Harvey Lectures 2004-2005

== See also ==
- Genetics of aging
