= Mutation accumulation theory =

Theory of aging

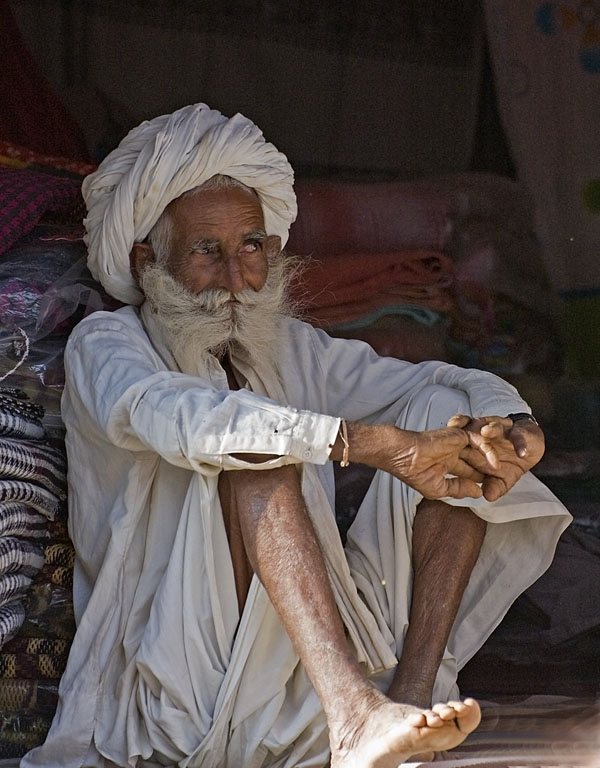
Older man from Faridabad, Haryana, India

The mutation accumulation theory of aging was first proposed by Peter Medawar in 1952 as an evolutionary explanation for biological aging and the associated decline in fitness that accompanies it. Medawar used the term 'senescence' to refer to this process. The theory explains that, in the case where harmful mutations are only expressed later in life, when reproduction has ceased and future survival is increasingly unlikely, then these mutations are likely to be unknowingly passed on to future generations. In this situation the force of natural selection will be weak, and so insufficient to consistently eliminate these mutations. Medawar posited that over time these mutations would accumulate due to genetic drift and lead to the evolution of what is now referred to as aging.

== Background and history ==
Despite Charles Darwin's completion of his theory of biological evolution in the 19th century, the modern logical framework for evolutionary theories of aging wouldn't emerge until almost a century later. Though August Weismann did propose his theory of programmed death, it was met with criticism and never gained mainstream attention. It wasn't until 1930 that Ronald Fisher first noted the conceptual insight which prompted the development of modern aging theories. This concept, namely that the force of natural selection on an individual decreases with age, was analysed further by J. B. S. Haldane, who suggested it as an explanation for the relatively high prevalence of Huntington's disease despite the autosomal dominant nature of the mutation. Specifically, as Huntington's only presents after the age of 30, the force of natural selection against it would have been relatively low in pre-modern societies. It was based on the ideas of Fisher and Haldane that Peter Medawar was able to work out the first complete model explaining why aging occurs, which he presented in a lecture in 1951 and then published in 1952.

== Mechanism of action ==
(a) The survival rate within a population decreases with age, while the reproduction rate remains constant. (b) The reproduction probability peaks early in life, at sexual maturity, and then steadily decreases as an individual ages, with the remaining share of the population decreasing with age as they enter the selection shadow.

Amongst almost all populations, the likelihood that an individual will reproduce is related directly to their age. Starting at 0 at birth, the probability increases to its maximum in young adulthood once sexual maturity has been reached, before gradually decreasing with age. This decrease is caused by the increasing likelihood of death due to external pressures such as predation or illness, as well as the internal pressures inherent to organisms that experience senescence. In such cases deleterious mutations which are expressed early on are strongly selected against due to their major impact on the number of offspring produced by that individual. Mutations that present later in life, by contrast, are relatively unaffected by selective pressure, as their carriers have already passed on their genes, assuming they survive long enough for the mutation to be expressed at all. The result, as predicted by Medawar, is that deleterious late-life mutations will accumulate and result in the evolution of aging as it is known colloquially. This concept is portrayed graphically by Medawar through the concept of a "selection shadow". The shaded region represents the 'shadow' of time during which selective pressure has no effect. Mutations that are expressed within this selection shadow will remain as long as reproductive probability within that age range remains low.

== Evidence supporting the mutation accumulation theory ==
=== Predation and Delayed Senescence ===
In populations where extrinsic mortality is low, the drop in reproductive probability after maturity is less severe than in other cases. The mutation accumulation theory therefore predicts that such populations would evolve delayed senescence. One such example of this scenario can be seen when comparing birds to organisms of equivalent size. It has been suggested that their ability to fly, and therefore lower relative risk of predation, is the cause of their longer than expected life span. The implication that flight, and therefore lower predation, increases lifespan is further born out by the fact that bats live on average 3 times longer than similarly sized mammals with comparable metabolic rates. Providing further evidence, insect populations are known to experience very high rates of extrinsic mortality, and as such would be expected to experience rapid senescence and short life spans. The exception to this rule, however, is found in the longevity of eusocial insect queens. As expected when applying the mutation accumulation theory, established queens are at almost no risk of predation or other forms of extrinsic mortality, and consequently age far more slowly than others of their species.

=== Age-specific reproductive success of Drosophila Melanogaster ===
In the interest of finding specific evidence for the mutation-accumulation theory, separate from that which also supports the similar antagonistic pleiotropy hypothesis, an experiment was conducted involving the breeding of successive generations of Drosophila Melanogaster. Genetic models predict that, in the case of mutation accumulation, elements of fitness, such as reproductive success and survival, will show age-related increases in dominance, homozygous genetic variance and additive variance. Inbreeding depression will also increase with age. This is because these variables are proportional to the equilibrium frequencies of deleterious alleles, which are expected to increase with age under mutation accumulation but not under the antagonistic pleiotropy hypothesis. This was tested experimentally by measuring age-specific reproductive success in 100 different genotypes of Drosophila Melanogaster, with findings ultimately supporting the mutation-accumulation theory of ageing. Later studies have tested age-specific effects of individual mutations on reproductive success and found support for a modified version of mutation-accumulation where the harmful effect of individual mutations increase with age.

== Criticisms of the mutation-accumulation theory ==
Under most assumptions, the mutation-accumulation theory predicts that mortality rates will reach close to 100% shortly after reaching post-reproductive age. Experimental populations of Drosophila Melanogaster, and other organisms, however, exhibit age-specific mortality rates that plateau well before reaching 100%, making mutation accumulation alone an insufficient explanation. It is suggested instead that mutation accumulation is only one factor among many, which together form the causes of aging. In particular, the mutation-accumulation theory, the antagonistic pleiotropy hypothesis and the disposable soma theory of aging are all believed to contribute in some way to senescence. A modified version of the mutation-accumulation theory where the harmful effect of individual mutations increase with age has also been suggested (positive pleiotropy).
