= Network theory of aging =

Theory on biology of aging

The network theory of aging supports the idea that multiple connected processes contribute to the biology of aging. Kirkwood and Kowald helped to establish the first model of this kind by connecting theories and predicting specific mechanisms. In departure of investigating a single mechanistic cause or single molecules that lead to senescence, the network theory of aging takes a systems biology view to integrate theories in conjunction with computational models and quantitative data related to the biology of aging.

== Implications ==
- The free radical theory, describing the reactions of free radicals, antioxidants and proteolytic enzymes, was computationally connected with the protein error theory to describe the error propagation loops within the cellular translation machinery.
- The study of gene networks revealed proteins associated with aging to have significantly higher connectivity than expected by chance.
- Investigation of aging on multiple levels of biological organization contributed to a physiome view, from genes to organisms, predicting lifespans based on scaling laws, fractal supply networks and metabolism as well as aging related molecular networks.
- The network theory of aging has encouraged the development of data bases related to human aging. Proteomic network maps suggest a relationship between the genetics of development and the genetics of aging.

== Hierarchical Elements ==
The network theory of aging provides a deeper look at the damage and repair processes at the cellular level and the ever changing balance between those processes. Aspects of the theory include:

1. Elementary particles of quantum systems- The aging process is described as an equation where a structure in an unbalanced state begins to change and that is seen primarily in the actions of quantum particles.
2. Monomers of biological macro-molecules- After a while, different types of protein damage become widespread due to the build up of damages within the protein. Over time, the maturation of cross-links, proteolytic cuts, and amino acid truncations are very apparent.
3. Proteins- Protein-protein exchanges either cease to exist or the connections between them become weaker due to energy loss and injury to the protein itself. This then leads to the protein being displaced in the cell.
4. Cells- Connections within the cell begin to either tighten or loosen up eventually leading to weakened connections. There is a high price associated with these connections, especially within the brain.
5. Organisms- As individuals age, their social networks begin to decline. Only thing remaining is the contacts for the most important social functions. Cognitive deterioration due to aging and loss of support systems leads to more declines in old age.
6. Social groups- A decline in social groups mimics the declines associated with the aging process.
7. Ecosystems forming a global ecological network- Networks within our ecosystems show us that we should be very concerned about the aging of our habitat.
8. Elements of human systems- The aging process can be portrayed through human conceptual, cultural, and technological networks. With time, each of these networks begin to decline.

== See also ==
- DNA damage theory of aging
- Disposable soma theory of aging
