= Stem cell theory of aging =

Theory of aging

The stem cell theory of aging postulates that the aging process is the result of the inability of various types of stem cells to continue to replenish the tissues of an organism with functional differentiated cells capable of maintaining that tissue's (or organ's) original function. Damage and error accumulation in genetic material is always a problem for systems regardless of the age. The number of stem cells in young people is very much higher than in older people and thus creates a better and more efficient replacement mechanism in the young contrary to the old. In other words, aging is not a matter of the increase in damage, but a matter of failure to replace it due to a decreased number of stem cells. Stem cells decrease in number and tend to lose the ability to differentiate into progenies or lymphoid lineages and myeloid lineages.

Maintaining the dynamic balance of stem cell pools requires several conditions. Balancing proliferation and quiescence along with homing (See niche) and self-renewal of hematopoietic stem cells are favoring elements of stem cell pool maintenance while differentiation, mobilization and senescence are detrimental elements. These detrimental effects will eventually cause apoptosis.

There are also several challenges when it comes to therapeutic use of stem cells and their ability to replenish organs and tissues. First, different cells may have different lifespans even though they originate from the same stem cells (See T-cells and erythrocytes), meaning that aging can occur differently in cells that have longer lifespans as opposed to the ones with shorter lifespans. Also, continual effort to replace the somatic cells may cause exhaustion of stem cells.

== Research ==
Some of the proponents of this theory have been Norman E. Sharpless, Ronald A. DePinho, Huber Warner, Alessandro Testori and others. Warner came to this conclusion after analyzing human case of Hutchinson's Gilford syndrome and mouse models of accelerated aging.

Stem cells will turn into certain cells as the body needs them. Stem cells divide more than non stem cells so the tendency of accumulating damage is greater. Although they have protective mechanisms, they still age and lose function. Matthew R. Wallenfang, Renuka Nayak and Stephen DiNardo showed this in their study. According to their findings, it is possible to track male GSCs labeled with lacZ gene in Drosophila model by inducing recombination with heat shock and observe the decrease in GSC number with aging. In order to mark GSCs with lacZ gene, flip recombinase (Flp)-mediated recombination is used to combine a ubiquitously active tubulin promoter followed by an FRT (flip recombinase target) site with a promotorless lacZ ORF (open reading frame) preceded by an FRT site. Heat shock is used to induce Flp recombinase marker gene expression is activated in dividing cells due to recombination. Consequently, all clone of cells derived from GSC are marked with a functional lacZ gene. By tracking the marked cells, they were able to show that GSCs do age.

Another study in a mouse model shows that stem cells do age and their aging can lead to heart failure. Findings of the study indicate that diabetes leads to premature myocyte senescence and death and together they result in the development of cardiomyopathy due to decreased muscle mass.

Recent work has suggested that, although adult tissue stem cells may be the key cell type in the aging process, they may contribute via reducing their differentiation rates, rather than via becoming exhausted. Under this model, when stem cells divide but do not differentiate, they produce an excess of daughter stem cells. This phenotype will be selected for, at the cellular level, if it is caused by heritable epigenetic changes or genetic mutations, and has the potential to overwhelm homeostatic regulation of cell numbers when organismal integrity is under reduced selection in later life.

Behrens et al. have reviewed evidence that age-dependent accumulation of DNA damage in both stem cells and cells that comprise the stem cell microenvironment is responsible, at least in part, for stem cell dysfunction with aging.

== Hematopoietic stem cell aging ==
Hematopoietic stem cells (HSCs) regenerate the blood system throughout life and maintain homeostasis. DNA strand breaks accumulate in long term HSCs during aging. This accumulation is associated with a broad attenuation of DNA repair and response pathways that depends on HSC quiescence. DNA ligase 4 (Lig4) has a highly specific role in the repair of double-strand breaks by non-homologous end joining (NHEJ). Lig4 deficiency in the mouse causes a progressive loss of HSCs during aging. These findings suggest that NHEJ is a key determinant of the ability of HSCs to maintain themselves over time.

== Hematopoietic stem cell diversity aging ==
A study showed that the clonal diversity of stem cells that produce blood cells gets drastically reduced around age 70 to a faster-growing few, substantiating a novel theory of ageing which could enable healthy aging.

== Hematopoietic mosaic loss of chromosome Y ==
A 2022 study showed that blood cells' loss of the Y chromosome in a subset of cells, called 'mosaic loss of chromosome Y' (mLOY) and reportedly affecting at least 40% of 70 years-old men to some degree, contributes to fibrosis, heart risks, and mortality in a causal way.

== Hair follicle stem cell aging ==
A key aspect of hair loss with age is the aging of the hair follicle. Ordinarily, hair follicle renewal is maintained by the stem cells associated with each follicle. Aging of the hair follicle appears to be primed by a sustained cellular response to the DNA damage that accumulates in renewing stem cells during aging. This damage response involves the proteolysis of type XVII collagen by neutrophil elastase in response to the DNA damage in the hair follicle stem cells. Proteolysis of collagen leads to elimination of the damaged cells and then to terminal hair follicle miniaturization.

== Evidence against the theory ==
Diseases such as Alzheimer's disease, end-stage renal failure and heart disease are caused by different mechanisms that are not related to stem cells. Also, some diseases related to hematopoietic system, such as aplastic anemia and complete bone marrow failure, are not especially age-dependent. Aplastic anemia is often an adverse effect of certain medications but as such it cannot really be considered as evidence against the stem cell theory of aging. The cellularity of the bone marrow does decrease with age and can be usually calculated by the formula 100-age, and this seems consistent with a stem cell theory of aging. A dog study published by Zaucha J.M, Yu C. and Mathioudakis G., et al. also shows evidence against the stem cell theory. Experimental comparison of the engraftment properties of young and old marrow in a mammal model, the dog, failed to show any decrement in stem cell function with age.

== Other theories of aging ==
The aging process can be explained with different theories. These are evolutionary theories, molecular theories, system theories and cellular theories. The evolutionary theory of ageing was first proposed in the late 1940s and can be explained briefly by the accumulation of mutations (evolution of ageing), disposable soma and antagonistic pleiotropy hypothesis. The molecular theories of ageing include phenomena such as gene regulation (gene expression), codon restriction, error catastrophe, somatic mutation, accumulation of genetic material (DNA) damage (DNA damage theory of aging) and dysdifferentiation. The system theories include the immunologic approach to ageing, rate-of-living and the alterations in neuroendocrinal control mechanisms. (See homeostasis). Cellular theory of ageing can be categorized as telomere theory, free radical theory (free-radical theory of aging) and apoptosis. The stem cell theory of aging is also a sub-category of cellular theories.
