= Extrinsic mortality =

Causes of death outside the individual's control

Extrinsic mortality is the sum of the effects of external factors, such as predation, starvation and other environmental factors not under control of the individual that cause death. This is opposed to intrinsic mortality, which is the sum of the effects of internal factors contributing to normal, chronologic aging, such as, for example, mutations due to DNA replication errors, and which determined species maximum lifespan. Extrinsic mortality plays a significant role in evolutionary theories of aging, as well as the discussion of health barriers across socioeconomic borders.

== Evolutionary theories of aging ==
Extrinsic mortality is implicit in both classical theories of aging and non-classical studies of aging. In both cases, its existence causes a selective pressure for either longer lifespans and later reproductive periods or shorter lifespans and earlier reproductive periods.

Classical theories of aging include:

- Mutation Accumulation Theory of Aging - Because extrinsic mortality is so high in the natural world, few animals survive to old age. As a result, random harmful germ line mutations accumulate with little to no selective disadvantage.
- Antagonistic Pleiotropy Hypothesis - Because pleiotropic genes that express phenotypes that increase fitness in early life and other phenotypes that decrease fitness in later life are generally selected for, harmful phenotypes contribute to senescence and an evolutionary tradeoff between lifespan and reproduction develops.
- Disposable Soma Theory of Aging - Because resources are often limited and the influence of natural selection declines with age for similar reasons as the Mutation Accumulation theory of aging, organisms that invest greater amounts of energy into earlier reproduction rather than long term body maintenance are more successful. The lack of somatic maintenance and anti-aging mechanisms leads to senescence.

These classical evolutionary theories of aging postulate that quantities of extrinsic mortality factors should inversely correlate with lifespan. In the Mutation Accumulation Theory of Aging, increased quantities of extrinsic mortality factors prevent selection against the development of random germ line mutations. In the Antagonistic Pleiotropy Hypothesis, extrinsic mortality factors prevent selection against pleiotropic genes expressing harmful phenotypes later in life. In the Disposable Soma Theory of Aging, extrinsic mortality factors prevent organisms from selecting mechanisms that encourage long term maintenance. However, some non-classical evolutionary theories of aging challenge this notion and there are examples of the opposite, i.e. quantities of extrinsic mortality factors correlate with lifespan.

Non-classical studies of aging tend to use models, whether they be biological or computational, to demonstrate aging mechanisms and trends across organisms. In a study conducted on guppies, it was found that fish at higher risk of predation, an extrinsic mortality factor, do not demonstrate an earlier onset of senescence than fish at a lower risk of predation. In addition, a study conducted on the nematode Caenorhabditis remanei revealed that nonrandom extrinsic mortality factors that are more representative of those faced by nematodes in nature lead to an increased lifespan and decreased senescence. Finally, a computational model using mammalian life tables revealed that extrinsic mortality factors had the ability to increase, decrease or have no effect on senescence across species. These studies contrast the theorized correlation between extrinsic mortality factors and decreased lifespan and reproductive age.

The divergence between classical theories of aging and non-classical studies of aging may be due to the influence of density dependence as an additional factor that interacts with extrinsic mortality to produce varying effects on reproduction and senescence. Through the use of theoretical models, the interaction between extrinsic mortality and density dependence has been shown to be a compensation mechanism, where the higher the strength of extrinsic mortality factors, the lower the influence of density dependence. This compensates the influence of both factors on senescence only if density dependence acts on survival independently of age.

== In modern human populations ==
=== Minimization in developed countries ===
In modern human populations, life expectancy has increased greatly due to advances in medicine lowering death in childbirth and preventing fatal childhood infections. This has led to a shift in the distribution of death from younger to older people, and was accompanied by a transition from extrinsic factors in death to a mixture of both intrinsic and extrinsic factors. Because extrinsic mortality factors have become relatively unimportant in the cause of death in most developed countries, an increasing proportion of the population of these countries is composed of older people beyond the period of reproduction and grand-parenting. Therefore, the reduction of extrinsic mortality factors in developed human populations has contributed to the ability of people to live longer than they can reproduce. However, the ability of people to live longer than they can reproduce is potentially attributed to the grandmother hypothesis, which states that menopause allows older women to provide alloparental care for grandchildren in order to increase their fitness.

=== Risk in developed countries ===
While extrinsic mortality is reduced both within developed countries and beyond, extrinsic risk is not perceived to be applied equally. A study conducted in North America demonstrates that in areas of lower socioeconomic status, people perceive themselves to be more susceptible to extrinsic mortality factors rather than intrinsic mortality factors. In addition, increased perceived extrinsic mortality risk is associated with a smaller investment in preventative health measures. In order to increase public health efficacy, the study states that reconstructing how extrinsic mortality risk is perceived in populations of lower socioeconomic status could limit psychological mechanisms that lead to the perceived fatalism of extrinsic risks.

=== On reproductive strategies in undeveloped countries ===
A study conducted on women living in rural Dominica demonstrates reproductive strategies that correspond with changing levels of extrinsic mortality factors, measured by infant mortality rates. The study demonstrates that in times of historically low infant mortality rates, women reproduced later in life. In times of high infant mortality rates, women reproduced earlier in life. In times of extremely high infant mortality rates, women tended to reproduce later in life, though the study hypothesizes that this may not be due to infant mortality specifically, rather the factors contributing to infant mortality leading to energetic stress, which prevented earlier pregnancy.

The correlation between this pattern and the pattern of reproduction predicted by the Disposable Soma Theory of Aging is evident in that both the theory and the pattern of reproduction of Dominican women predict earlier reproduction in times of extrinsic stress.
