= Michael R. Rose =

- Born: 25 July 1955 (age 71)
- Occupation: Evolutionary biologist

Michael R. Rose (born 25 July 1955) is a professor in the Department of Ecology and Evolutionary Biology at the University of California, Irvine.

== Biography ==
Michael Roberson Rose was born on 25 July 1955. He has a son, Darius, as he indicated (dedication) in his book.

=== Education ===
He obtained his Bachelor of Science (B.S.) in 1975 from Queen's University at Kingston, Ontario, Canada.

In 1976 he obtained his Master of Science (M.S.). In 1978 he obtained his PhD from the University of Sussex.

His Ph.D. advisor was Brian Charlesworth, who supplied him with the original impetus for working on aging, and his main area of work has since been the evolution of aging, approached both theoretically and empirically via the technique of experimental evolution.

== Evolution and Biology of aging ==
In 1991, he published Evolutionary Biology of Aging exploring a view of the subject based on antagonistic pleiotropy, the hypothesis that aging is caused by genes that have two effects, one acting early in life and the other much later. The genes are favored by natural selection as a result of their early-life benefits, and the costs that accrue much later appear as incidental side-effects that we identify as aging. Dr. Rose has also suggested that aging can stop in a latter stage of life. The field of aging biology is divided between those who think that it will be very difficult to develop technology to postpone human aging and those who expect breakthroughs in this field in the near future. Rose is an outspoken advocate for the former position.

=== Antagonistic pleiotropy ===
The phenomenon was first described by George C. Williams in 1957, but it was Rose who coined the phrase "antagonistic pleiotropy". Rose's laboratory has conducted the longest-running experimental evolution experiment designed to test the theory of antagonistic pleiotropy. Fruit flies (Drosophila melanogaster) are being bred for longevity by collecting eggs from the longest-lived flies in each generation. The experiment has run since 1981, and has produced flies with quadruple the original life span. The prediction of the antagonistic pleiotropy hypothesis was that these long-lived flies would have much lower fertility early in life. The result has been the opposite - that the long-lived flies actually lay more eggs at every stage of life. Rose explains this result in terms of an interaction between genotype and environment. The long-lived flies show other weaknesses that would make them poor competitors in the wild, and perhaps these traits are the true areas of antagonistic pleiotropy. He is one of the biologists featured in the 1995 science documentary Death by Design/The Life and Times of Life and Times. In 1997, Rose was awarded the Busse Research Prize by the World Congress of Gerontology. He has authored The Long Tomorrow: How Advances in Evolutionary Biology Can Help Us Postpone Aging.

=== Protagonistic pleiotropy ===
If the effect on fitness of increase in mortality is zero, as is the case after the age when survival affects reproduction, then natural selection does not weed out the tendency for rates of mortality to accelerate with age. The idea that selection for reproduction in youth causes accumulating dysfunction in later adulthood is a commonly accepted explanation for aging. Protagonistic pleiotropy is the opposite effect: beneficial effects in later life as a result of selection for reproduction in earlier life. Rose contends that a correct understanding of Hamilton's equations through mathematical modeling show that protagonistic pleiotropy is plausible.

== Mortality-rate plateaus ==
Rose's most recent book is Does Aging Stop?. W. D. Hamilton advanced the idea that any gene killing an organism before it reproduced would be weeded out by natural selection. However, genes that kill later in life, after reproduction ceases, can remain in the population. For Rose, this suggests that aging is a result of "declining forces of natural selection." He points to studies of the demographic data in large-scale fruit fly experiments and actuarial data for humans which he believes support the hypothesis that acceleration in death rates can halt in later life. According to Rose, mortality-rate plateaus have not often been noticed in humans because they are only seen in specific-age cohorts of the very old. His proposed explanation is that at a stage of life beyond the potential to reproduce, the effect of natural selection is no longer falling as it has 'bottomed out'. Rose suggests that if a decline in the effect of natural selection is responsible for aging, then when this decline finally ends, at post-reproductive age, aging could halt. He reasons it follows that aging is "not a cumulative process of progressive chemical damage, like rust, at late ages, aging can stop".

=== Human late life ===
According to Rose, relative to the age of reproductive maturity a transition to the late-life stage of life occurs much later in humans than in the populations of flies for which there are data. In humans, the 'late-life' stage of life is only reached at 90 years old, whereas the data for flies scaled to humans would predict a 'late-life' stage for humans at 40–50 years old. Rose suggests that human populations' adoption of agriculture led to more children surviving to adulthood, and to reproduction occurring later in life. Agriculture is also hypothesized by Rose to have resulted in high population density, thereby increasing the range of ages not under selection.

== Awards ==
- British Commonwealth Scholar, 1976–79; NATO Science Fellow, 1979-1981;
- NSERC of Canada University Research Fellow, 1981–88; President's Prize, American Society of Naturalists, 1992;
- Excellence in Teaching Award, University of California, Irvine Biological Sciences, 1996;
- Busse Prize, World Congress of Gerontology, 1997.

== See also ==
=== Books ===
- Garland, T., Jr., and M. R. Rose, eds. (2009). Experimental Evolution: Concepts, Methods, and Applications of Selection Experiments. University of California Press, Berkeley, California. xvii + 730 pages. ISBN 978-0520261808
- Mueller, Laurence D.; Rauser, Casandra L.; Rose, Michael R. (2011). Does Aging Stop?. New York: Oxford University Press. p. xviii + 204. ISBN 978-0199754229.

=== Articles ===
- Zwaan, Bas J. (1999). "The evolutionary genetics of ageing and longevity". Heredity. 82. Nature Portfolio: 589–597.
- Levine, Morgan (2023). "Live long & prosper: evidence of evolutionary forces on lifespan". Nature Reviews Genetics. 24. Nature Portfolio: 72.

=== External links ===
- Michael Rose's 55 Website of Rose.
- Rose's UC Irvine faculty profile
- Audio of interview with Rose
- Faculty page at UC Irvine
- Article in the New York Times, December 6, 2005
- Google E-book The Long Tomorrow
