= Newcastle 85+ Study =

The Newcastle 85+ Study is a longitudinal study of health and aging of people over 85 years old. It began in 2006, led by Professor Tom Kirkwood at Newcastle University, and included over 1,000 85-year-olds born in 1921 and registered with GPs in Newcastle and North Tyneside, England.

11% of those studied said their health was excellent when compared with others of the same age. About 37% of the men and about 70% of the women reported they could still manage cooking, bathing and their personal finances. Their average number of diseases was four for men and five for women. Most of the subjects were cared for by their female children who were generally around 60.

There will be a further study of people born in 1931.
