= Bacterial senescence =

Gradual decrease in cellular function in individual bacteria

Bacterial senescence or bacterial aging refers to the gradual decrease in cellular function in individual bacteria as they increase in age. Indicators of senescence include a decelerated division rate and an increase likelihood of death.

The fundamental cause of aging in bacteria is thought to be the accumulation of deleterious components (aging factors). Asymmetrically dividing bacteria, such as Caulobacter crescentus, show signs of replicative aging. The results for symmetrically dividing bacteria are more nuanced. For example, Escherichia coli, under certain experimental conditions, may exhibit signs of replicative aging caused by subtle asymmetries in its division.

== Factors contributing to aging ==
Aging factors can be defined as irreparable damages to cellular components which ultimately contribute to the decreased fitness of the individual harbouring them. Putative aging factors include damaged DNA strands, old cell-surface material, and mis-folded or aggregated protein. The cell poles of replicating E. coli are often used as a proxy for aging factors as each bacterium inherits an old cell-pole (mother's pole) and a newly synthesized new cell-pole. Inclusion bodies, masses of aggregated damaged or mis-folded proteins, have recently been shown to contribute to the aging of cellular organisms.

Senescence in single celled organisms is thought to arise via the asymmetric partitioning of aging factors between daughter cells. It has long been argued that, on theoretical grounds, the preferential segregation of damage in unicellular organisms would contribute to the fitness of the overall population. The single celled eukaryotic organism, Saccharomyces cerevisiae, retains deleterious aging factors in the mother cell leading to rejuvenation of the daughter.

== Aging in asymmetrically dividing bacteria ==
A well-established example of bacterial aging is Caulobacter crescentus. This bacterium begins its life as a motile swarmer cell. Once it has found a suitable substrate, the swarmer cell will differentiate into a non-motile stalked cell.The asymmetrically dividing cells then show signs of detrimental genetic variation as they divide. The stalked cell then becomes reproductively active and gives rise to new swarmer cells. The number of progenies produced per hour by individual swarmer cells was shown to decrease with age. This was the first evidence of bacterial aging. Aging in asymmetrically dividing bacteria could also be due to the division of cell damage in the cell fission stage increasing the damage in one cell and purging it in another. This is also true for B.subtilis the asymmetric cell division generates two cells that contain different regulatory proteins and express different fates one becomes of the daughters becoming able to transcript and the other cannot.

== Aging in symmetrically dividing bacteria ==
Organisms which replicate via symmetric division, such as E. coli, are thought to be immortal. However, by tracking the inheritance of both the new and old cell pole, evidence of aging was found in E. coli. A cell which has consecutively inherited the old cell pole has been shown to exhibit a significantly decreased growth rate. The decline in growth rate in Stewart et al. appears to be at least partially attributed to the preferential localization of inclusion bodies near the old cell wall. This localization is thought to be the passive result of the slow diffusion of the large aggregate, and the exclusion of the aggregate by the nucleoid. A similar mechanism of aging has been found to occur in Schizosaccharomyces pombe, which divides via symmetrical binary fission. Mutations in the cells did not show any signs of aging with respect to growth in the symmetrically dividing E.Coli until the cells with deficient repair enzymes and an increased number of mutations caused the growth rate to decrease, the repair-deficient cells reduced growth in a stepwise manner which suggest that single mutations can cause a growth reduction or can cease growth completely which caused the bacteria to die.

However, the original findings of E. coli aging have been partially refuted by more recent microfluidics-based studies, in which individual E. coli showed a constant growth rate for hundreds of consecutive cell divisions, although the death rate increased in each cell division. This discrepancy may be due to the different culturing methods used in the two studies, i.e., growth on agar pads vs. in a microfluidic device.

== See also ==
- Ageing
- Biological immortality
- Senescence
