= Selection shadow =

(a) The survival rate of a population decreases as individuals age, but the reproduction rate remains constant. (b) The reproduction probability peaks early in life at sexual maturity and then steadily decreases as an individual ages, with the remaining share of the population decreasing with age as they enter the selection shadow.

The selection shadow is a concept involved with the evolutionary theories of aging that states that selection pressures on an individual decrease as an individual ages and passes sexual maturity, resulting in a "shadow" of time where selective fitness is not considered. Over generations, this results in maladaptive mutations that accumulate later in life due to aging being non-adaptive toward reproductive fitness. The concept was first worked out by J. B. S. Haldane and Peter Medawar in the 1940s, with Medawar creating the first graphical model.

== Model ==
The model developed by Medawar states that due to the dangerous conditions and pressures from the environment, including predators and diseases, most individuals in the wild die not long after sexual maturity. Therefore, there is a low probability for individuals to survive to an advanced age and suffer the effects related to aging. In conjunction with this, the effects of natural selection decrease as age increases, so that later individual performance is ignored by selection forces. This results in beneficial mutations not being selected for if they only have a positive result later in life, along with later in life deleterious mutations not being selected against. Due to the fitness of an individual not being affected once it is past its reproductive prime, later mutations and effects are considered to be in the "shadow" of selection.

This concept would later be adapted into Medawar's 1952 mutation accumulation hypothesis, which was itself expanded upon by George C. Williams in his 1957 antagonistic pleiotropy hypothesis.

A classical requirement and constraint of the model is that the number of individuals within a population that live to reach senescence must be small in number. If this is not true for a population, then the effects of old age will not be under a selection shadow and instead affect adaptation and evolution of the population as a whole. At the same time, however, this requirement has been challenged by increasing evidence of senescence being more common in wild populations than previously expected, especially among birds and mammals, while the effects of the selection shadow remain present.

== Medawar's Test Tube model ==
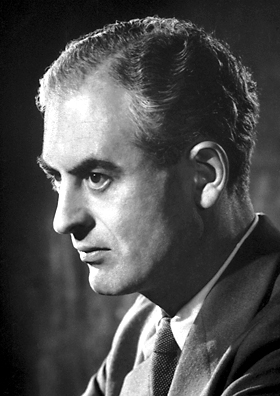
Peter Brian Medawar, the scientist/biologist behind the test tube theory. This theory was created to demonstrate how older test tubes are continuously replaced when they are broken, thus decreasing older test tube population numbers as time progresses. The test tubes were symbols for individual subjects in a species.

Medawar developed a theoretical model to demonstrate his thought process which explained that most animals will die before aging will be the ultimate cause for death in that animal. This would be from environmental factors such as large storms, drought, and fires, and predation. Medawar wanted to demonstrate this possibility by using test tubes to get his point across. The test tubes would be used to represent a population of species. If one of these test tubes were to theoretically break, this would represent an individual animal dying. Randomly, test tubes would then be broken in the population to keep his model realistic. The broken test tubes would be replaced with a new one, which represents a new animal being born into the population. Over time, the model showed that test tubes over a certain age would decline in the population as new test tubes were put in. The overall results in Medawar's thought model demonstrated an exponential decline in the survivor curve which resulted in the population having a half life. The amount of older animals, or test tubes in the population would then be harder to maintain and ultimately die. Medawar created this model to ultimately explain what would realistically happen in actual life.

== Criticism ==
Some scientists, however, have criticized the idea of aging being non-adaptive, instead adopting the theory of "death by design". This theory follows the work of August Weismann, which states that aging specifically evolved as an adaptation, and disagrees with Medawar's model as a perceived oversimplification of the impact older organisms have on evolution. It is also claimed that older organisms have a higher reproductive capacity due to being better fit in order to reach their age, rather than their capacity being equal as in Medawar's calculations.
