= Gerontogens =

Aging chemical agents

Gerontogens are environmental agents that can accelerate aging in some animals, including humans. Gerontogens are typically toxic chemical agents, such as those found in cigarette smoke. However, many other things can act as gerontogens, including ultraviolet radiation, chemotherapy treatment, and arsenic.

Gerontogens work in two different ways. They can shorten telomeres, repetitive nucleotide sequences at the end of chromosomes, which accelerates cell destruction. Gerontogens can also accelerate the rate of cellular senescence, where normal diploid cells cease to divide. This can be measured using the body's levels of the protein p16.
