= Catgrip =

Molecular binding feature

Catgrips are small cation-binding molecular features of proteins and peptides. Each consists of the main chain atoms only of three consecutive amino acid residues. The first and third main chain CO groups bind the cations, often calcium, magnesium, potassium or sodium, with no side chain involvement. Many catgrips bind a water molecule instead of a cation; it is hydrogen-bonded to the first and third main chain CO groups. Catgrips are found as calcium-binding features in annexins, matrix metalloproteinases (e.g.serralysins), subtilisins and phospholipase A2. They are also observed in synthetic peptides and in cyclic hexapeptides made from alternating D,L amino acids.

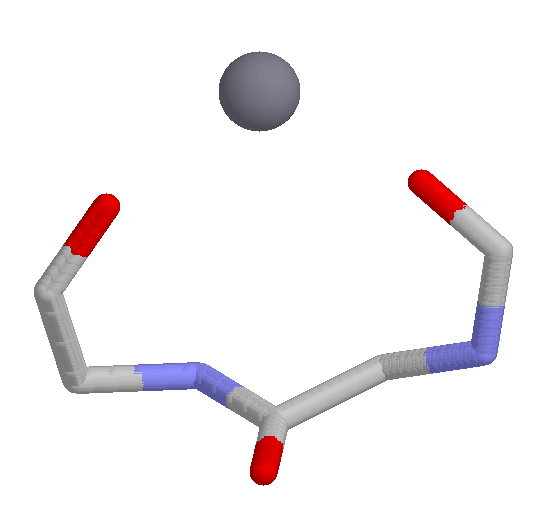
Residues 98-100 of annexin V (2ran, main chain atoms only) bound to a calcium ion

The conformation of a catgrip is such that the CO groups of the first and third amino acid residues are liable to be electrostatically attracted or hydrogen bonded to a positively charged, or partially positively charged, atom or group. Catgrips are defined by the phi, psi main chain dihedral angles of the second and third amino acids in the nest.

If two catgrips overlap such that two successive residues are both residue i of catgrips, a compound catgrip is formed. If three overlap such that three successive residues are residue i of catgrips, a longer catgrip is formed and so on. Such overlapping motifs may bind one, two or three metal ions. An example is given by residues 586-590 of Cas9 endonuclease (pdb code 4oge) where the mainchain CO groups from residues i, i+2 and i+4 bind a magnesium ion.

Another tripeptide motif that often binds cations or δ+ groups via main chain CO groups is called the niche (protein structural motif).
