= Disposable soma theory of aging =

Model of aging as a trade-off between growth, reproduction, and DNA maintenance

In biogerontology, the disposable soma theory of aging states that organisms age due to an evolutionary trade-off between growth, reproduction, and DNA repair maintenance. Formulated by British biologist Thomas Kirkwood, the disposable soma theory explains that an organism only has a limited amount of resources that it can allocate to its various cellular processes. Therefore, a greater investment in growth and reproduction would result in reduced investment in DNA repair maintenance, leading to increased cellular damage, shortened telomeres, accumulation of mutations, compromised stem cells, and ultimately, senescence. Although many models, both animal and human, have appeared to support this theory, parts of it are still controversial. Specifically, while the evolutionary trade-off between growth and aging has been well established, the relationship between reproduction and aging is still without scientific consensus, and the cellular mechanisms largely undiscovered.

== Background and history ==
Many theories on the evolution of aging exist. British biologist Thomas Kirkwood first proposed the disposable soma theory of aging in a 1977 Nature review article. The theory was inspired by Leslie Orgel's Error Catastrophe Theory of Aging, which was published fourteen years earlier, in 1963. Orgel believed that the process of aging arose due to mutations acquired during the replication process, and Kirkwood developed the disposable soma theory in order to mediate Orgel's work with evolutionary genetics.

== Principles ==
The disposable soma theory of aging posits that there is a trade-off in resource allocation between somatic maintenance and reproductive investment. Too low an investment in self-repair would be evolutionarily unsound, as the organism would likely die before reproductive age. However, too high an investment in self-repair would also be evolutionarily unsound due to the fact that one's offspring would likely die before reproductive age. Therefore, there is a compromise and resources are partitioned accordingly. However, this compromise is thought to damage somatic repair systems, which can lead to progressive cellular damage and senescence. Repair costs can be categorized into three groups: (1) the costs of increased durability of nonrenewable parts; (2) the costs of maintenance involving cell renewal, and (3) the costs of intracellular maintenance. In a nutshell, aging and decline is essentially a trade-off for increased reproductive robustness in youth.

== Mechanisms ==
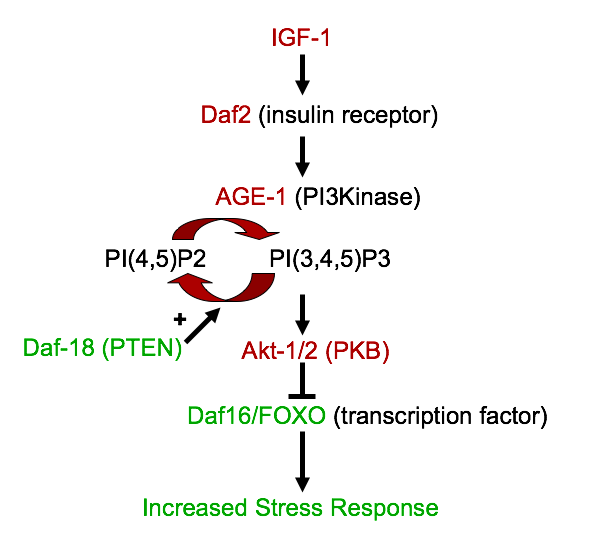
The IGF-1 pathway, which represses FOXO, thus preventing gene expression of longevity-inducing proteins

=== Growth and somatic maintenance ===
Much research has been done on the antagonistic effects of increased growth on lifespan. Specifically, the hormone insulin-like growth factor 1 (IGF-1), binds to a cell receptor, leading to a phosphorylation cascade. This cascade results in kinases phosphorylating forkhead transcription factor (FOXO), deactivating it. Deactivation of FOXO results in an inability to express genes involved in responding to oxidative stress response, such as antioxidants, chaperones, and heat-shock proteins. Additionally, uptake of IGF-1 stimulates the mTOR pathway, which activates protein synthesis (and therefore growth) through upregulation of the translation-promoting S6K1, and also inhibits autophagy, a process necessary for recycling of damaged cellular products. Decline of autophagy causes neurodegeneration, protein aggregation and premature aging. Lastly, studies have also indicated that the mTOR pathway also alters immune responses and stimulates cyclin-dependent kinase (CDK) inhibitors such as p16 and p21. This leads to alteration of the stem-cell niche and results in stem cell exhaustion, another theorized mechanism of aging.

=== Reproduction and somatic maintenance ===
While reproduction inhibits lifespan with regard to multicellular organisms, the precise mechanism responsible for this effect remains unclear. Although many models do illustrate an inverse relationship, and the theory makes sense from an evolutionary perspective, the cellular mechanisms have yet to be explored. However, with regards to cellular replication, the progressive shortening of telomeres is a mechanism which limits the amount of generations of a single cell may undergo. Furthermore, in unicellular organisms like Saccharomyces cerevisiae, the formation of extrachromosomal rDNA circles (ERCs) in mother cells (but not daughter cells) upon every subsequent division is an identifiable type of DNA damage that is associated with replication. These ERCs accumulate over time and eventually trigger replicative senescence and death of the mother cell.

== Evidence ==
=== Growth and aging ===
There is a large body of evidence indicating the negative effects of growth on longevity across many species. As a general rule, individuals of a smaller size generally live longer than larger individuals of the same species.

==== Animal models ====
In dwarf models of mice, such Snell or Ames mice, mutations have arisen, either rendering them incapable of producing IGF-1 or unable to have adequate receptors for IGF-1 uptake. Furthermore, mice injected with growth hormone have been shown to have progressive weight loss, roughing of the coat, curvature of the spine, enlargement of the organs, kidney lesions and increased cancer risk. This effect is also seen in different breeds of dogs, where smaller breeds of dogs typically live significantly longer compared to their larger counterparts. Selectively bred for their small size, smaller dog breeds like the Chihuahua (average lifespan of 15–20 years) have the B/B genotype for the IGF-1 haplotype, reducing the amount of IGF-1 produced. Conversely, large dogs like the Great Dane (average lifespan of 6–8 years) are homozygous for the IGF-1 I allele, which increases the amount of IGF-1 production.

==== Human models ====
Initially, it was believed that growth hormone actually prolonged lifespan due to a 1990 study that indicated that injection of growth hormone to men over 60 years of age appeared to reverse various biomarkers implicated in aging, such as decreased muscle mass, bone density, skin thickness, and increased adipose tissue. However, a 1999 study found that administering growth hormone also significantly increased mortality rate. Recent genomic studies have confirmed that the genes involved in growth hormone uptake and signaling are largely conserved across a plethora of species, such as yeast, nematodes, fruit flies, mice and humans. These studies have also shown that individuals with Laron syndrome, an autosomal recessive disorder resulting in dwarfism due to defects in growth hormone receptors, have increased lifespan. Additionally, these individuals have much lower incidences of age-related diseases such as type 2 diabetes and cancer. Lastly, human centenarians around the world are disproportionately of short stature, and have low levels of IGF-1.

=== Reproduction and aging ===
Numerous studies have found that lifespan is inversely correlated with both the total amount of offspring birthed, as well as the age at which females first gives birth, also known as primiparity. Additionally, it has been found that reproduction is a costly mechanism that alters the metabolism of fat. Lipids invested in reproduction would be unable to be allocated to support mechanisms involved in somatic maintenance.

==== Animal models ====
The disposable soma theory has been consistent with the majority of animal models. It was found in numerous animal studies that castration or genetic deformities of reproduction organs was correlated with increased lifespan. Moreover, in red squirrels, it was found that females with an early primiparity achieved the highest immediate and lifetime reproductive success. However, it was also found that these same individuals had a decreased median and maximum lifespan. Specifically squirrels who mated earlier had a 22.4% rate of mortality until two years of age compared to a 16.5% rate of mortality in late breeders. In addition, these squirrels had an average maximum lifespan of 1035 days compared to an average maximum lifespan of 1245 days for squirrels that bred later.

In another study, researchers selectively bred fruit flies over three years to develop two different strains, an early-reproducing strain and a late-reproducing strain. The late-reproducing line had a significantly longer lifespan than the early-reproducing line. Even more telling was that when the researchers introduced a mutation in the ovarian-associated gene ovoD1, resulting in defective oogenesis, the differences in lifespan between the two lines disappeared. The researchers in this case concluded that "aging has evolved primarily because of the damaging effects of reproduction earlier in life".

Prominent aging researcher Steven Austad also performed a large-scale ecological study on the coast of Georgia in 1993. Austad isolated two opossum populations, one from the predator-infested mainland and one from the predator-absent nearby island of Sapelo. According to the disposable soma theory, a genetically isolated population subject to low environmentally-induced mortality would evolve delayed reproduction and aging. This is because without the pressure of predation, it would be evolutionarily advantageous to allocate more resources to somatic maintenance than reproduction, as early offspring mortality would be low. As predicted, even after controlling for predation, the isolated population had a longer lifespan, delayed primiparity, and reduced aging biomarkers such as tail collagen cross-linking.

==== Human models ====
In general, only a few studies exist in human models. It was found that castrated men live longer than their fertile counterparts. Further studies found that in British women, primiparity was earliest in women who died early and latest in women who died at the oldest ages. Furthermore, increased number of children birthed was associated with a decreased lifespan. A final study found that female centenarians were more likely to have children in later life compared to the average, especially past the age of 40. The researchers discovered that 19.2% of female centenarians had their first child after the age of 40, compared to 5.5% of the rest of the female population.

=== Relationship between cell damage and aging ===
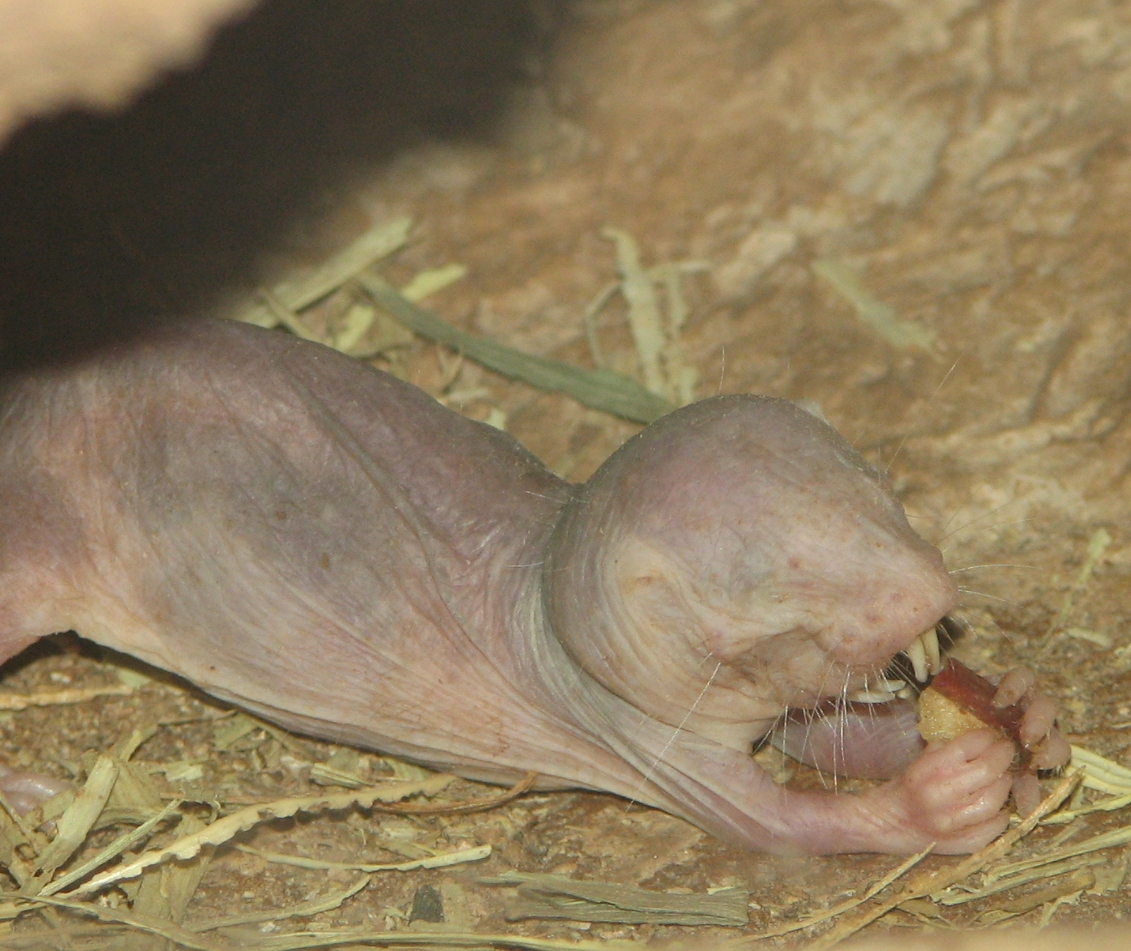
The naked mole rat has a disproportionately long life of 30 years through efficient cellular repair mechanisms.

There are numerous studies that support cellular damage, often due to a lack of somatic maintenance mechanisms, as a primary determinant for aging, and these studies have given rise to the free radical theory of aging and the DNA damage theory of aging. One study found that the cells of short-living rodents in vitro show much greater mutation rates and a general lack of genome surveillance compared to human cells and are far more susceptible to oxidative stress. Other studies have been conducted on the naked mole rat, a rodent species with remarkable longevity (30 years), capable of outliving the brown rat (3 years) by ten-fold. Additionally, almost no incidence of cancer has ever been detected in naked mole rats. Nearly all of the differences found between these two organisms, which are otherwise rather genetically similar, was in somatic maintenance. Naked mole rats were found to have higher levels of superoxide dismutase, a reactive oxygen species clearing antioxidant. In addition, naked mole rats had higher levels of base excision repair, DNA damage response signaling, homologous recombination repair, mismatch repair, nucleotide excision repair, and non-homologous end joining. In fact, many of these processes were near or exceeded human levels. Proteins from naked mole rats were also more resistant to oxidation, misfolding, ubiquitination, and had increased translational fidelity.

Further studies have been conducted on patients with Hutchinson-Gilford Progeria Syndrome (HGPS), a condition that leads to premature aging. Patients with HGPS typically age about seven times faster than average and usually succumb to the disease in their early teens. Patients with HGPS have cellular defects, specifically in the lamin proteins, which regulate the organization of the lamina and nuclear envelope for mitosis. A-type lamins promote genetic stability by maintaining levels of proteins that have key roles in the repair processes of non-homologous end joining and homologous recombination. Mouse cells deficient for maturation of prelamin A show increased DNA damage and chromosome aberrations and have increased sensitivity to DNA damaging agents.

Lastly, as mentioned previously, it has been found that the suppression of autophagy is associated with reduced lifespan, while stimulation is associated with extended lifespan. Activated in times of caloric restriction, autophagy is a process that prevents cellular damage through clearance and recycling of damaged proteins and organelles.

== Criticism ==
One of the main weaknesses of the disposable soma theory is that it does not postulate any specific cellular mechanisms to which an organism shifts energy to somatic repair over reproduction. Instead, it only offers an evolutionary perspective on why aging may occur due to reproduction. Therefore, parts of it are rather limited outside of the field of evolutionary biology.

=== Caloric restriction ===
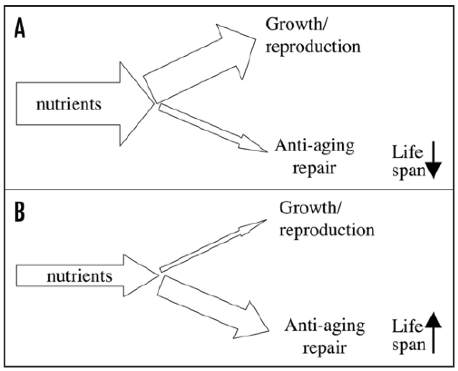
Schematic showing the reallocation of energy investment towards self-repair during caloric restriction

Critics have pointed out the supposed inconsistencies of the disposable soma theory due to the observed effects of caloric restriction, which is correlated with increased lifespan. Although it activates autophagy, according to classical disposable soma principles, with less caloric intake, there would less total energy to be distributed towards somatic maintenance, and decreased lifespan would be observed (or at least the positive autophagic effects would be balanced out). However, Kirkwood, alongside his collaborator Darryl P. Shanley, assert that caloric restriction triggers an adaptive mechanism which causes the organism to shift a higher proportion of resources to somatic maintenance, away from reproduction. This theory is supported by multiple studies, which show that caloric restriction typically results in impaired fertility, but leave an otherwise healthy organism. Evolutionarily, an organism would want to delay reproduction to when resources were more plentiful. During a resource-barren period, it would evolutionarily unwise to invest resources in progeny that would be unlikely to survive in famine. Mechanistically, the NAD-dependent deacetylase Sirtuin 1 (SIRT-1) is upregulated during low-nutrient periods. SIRT-1 increases insulin sensitivity, decreases the amount of inflammatory cytokines, stimulates autophagy, and activates FOXO, the aforementioned protein involved in activating stress response genes. SIRT-1 is also found to result in decreased fertility.

In additional to differential partitioning of energy allocation during caloric restriction, less caloric intake would result in less metabolic waste in the forms of free radicals like hydrogen peroxide, superoxide and hydroxyl radicals, which damage important cellular components, particularly mitochondria. Elevated levels of free radicals in mice has been correlated with neurodegeneration, myocardial injury, severe anemia, and premature death.

No changes were observed in the spontaneous chromosomal mutation frequency of dietary restricted mice (aged 6 and 12 months) compared to ad libitum fed control mice. Thus dietary restriction appears to have no appreciable effect on spontaneous mutation in chromosomal DNA, and the increased longevity of dietary restricted mice apparently is not attributable to reduced chromosomal mutation frequency.

=== The grandmother hypothesis ===
Another primary criticism of the disposable soma theory is that it fails to account for why women tend to live longer than their male counterparts. After all, females invest significantly more resources into reproduction and according to the classical disposable soma principles, this would compromise energy diverted to somatic maintenance. However, this can be reconciled with the grandmother hypothesis. The Grandmother Hypothesis states that menopause comes about into older women in order to restrict the time of reproduction as a protective mechanism. This would allow women to live longer and increase the amount of care they could provide to their grandchildren, increasing their evolutionary fitness. And so, although women do invest a greater proportion of resources into reproduction during their fertile years, their overall reproductive period is significantly shorter than men, who are able of reproduction during and even beyond middle age. Additionally, males invest more resources into growth compare to females, which is correlated with decreased lifespan. Other variables such as increased testosterone levels in males are not accounted for. Increased testosterone is often associated with reckless behaviour, which may lead to a high accidental death rate.

=== Contradicting models ===
A few contradicting animal models weaken the validity of the disposable soma theory. This includes studies done on the aforementioned naked mole rats. In these studies, it was found that reproductive naked mole rats actually show significantly increased lifespans compared to non-reproductive individuals, which contradicts the principles of disposable soma. However, although these naked mole rats are mammalian, they are highly atypical in terms of aging studies and may not serve as the best model for humans. For example, naked mole rats have a disproportionately high longevity quotient and live in eusocial societies, where breeding is usually designated to a queen.

=== Sex biases and environment ===
The disposable soma theory is tested disproportionately on female organisms for the relationship between reproduction and aging, as females carry a greater burden in reproduction. Additionally, for the relationship between growth and aging, studies are disproportionately conducted on males, to minimize the hormonal fluctuations that occur with menstrual cycling. Lastly, genetic and environmental factors, rather than reproductive patterns, may explain the variations in human lifespan. For example, studies have shown that poorer individuals, to whom nutritious food and medical care is less accessible, typically have higher birth rates and earlier primiparity.
