= Niche (protein structural motif) =

In the area of protein structural motifs, niches are three or four amino acid residue features in which main-chain CO groups are bridged by positively charged or δ^{+} groups. The δ^{+} groups include groups with two hydrogen bond donor atoms such as NH_{2} groups and water molecules. In typical proteins, 7% of amino acid residues belong to niches bound to a δ^{+} group, while another 7% have the conformation but no single cationic bridging group is detected.

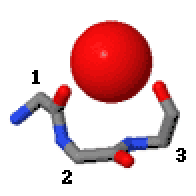
Niche3 bound to a water molecule via two O-H^{...}O hydrogen bonds. The red sphere is the oxygen of the water. The mainchain atoms of the niche3 tripeptide are shown as sticks. Oxygen, red; nitrogen, blue; carbon, grey. Hydrogen atoms not shown.

Niches are of two kinds, distinguished as niche3 (3 residues, i to i+2) and niche4 (4 residues, i to i+3). In a niche3 motif the δ^{+}-binding carbonyl groups are from residues i and i+2 while in a niche4 motif they are from residues i and i+3.

A niche3 has the α conformation for residue i+1 and the β conformation for residue i+2; a niche4 has the α conformation for residues i+1 and i+2 and the β conformation for residue i+3.

A niche occurs commonly at the C-terminus of α-helices and especially of 3_{10} helices.

Metal ions that occur bound to niches in proteins are Na^{+}, K^{+}, Ca^{2+}, and Mg^{2+}. Proteins with regulatory cations often employ niches for metal binding (e.g., thrombin, Na^{+}; annexin, Ca^{2+}; pyruvate dehydrogenase, K^{+}).

A major cation transporter in cells is calcium ATPase. In the Ca^{2+}-bound crystal structures the two calcium ions side-by-side within the transmembrane domain are thought to be at the halfway stage of being transported. As well as being bound by various side chain carbonyl groups, one of these calcium ions is bound by a niche3/niche4 (both in the one motif) at residues 304–307 at the C-terminus of an α-helix.

A lysine side chain in the nuclear export receptor CRM1 is recognised specifically by a niche conformation that has to be adopted as a key part of the nuclear export signal of proteins exiting the nucleus.

A sodium ion in the Fluc fluoride channel is situated at the dyad axis of the dimer, bound tetrahedrally by two niche4s, one from each subunit. A Sodium ion bound in similar ways at the domain interface is seen in several other Na+-coupled transporters.

The Hsp70 interdomain linker region of 10 residues enables allosteric communication between two folded domains. The N-terminal part of the linker has a niche4 structure that is water-bound.

In the scorpion toxin BeM9 the side chain of arginine 60 binds the carbonyls of residues 61 and 63 as a niche3. The motif, loss of which alters the specificity of the protein for voltage-gated sodium channels, is named "arginine hand". The slightly unusual dihedral angles for a niche3 are because this niche3 accommodates two separate NH groups from the arginine's guanidino group.

Another small tripeptide motif that binds cations or δ^{+} groups via main-chain CO groups is called the catgrip.
