= Tom Kirkwood =

British biogerontologist

- Born: 6 July 1951 (age 75); Durban, South Africa
- Known for: The disposable soma theory of aging
- Awards: Commander of the Order of the British Empire (2009)
- Scientific career
- Fields: Gerontology
- Workplaces: Newcastle University (UK)

Thomas Burton Loram Kirkwood (6 July 1951) is a South-African born English biologist who made his contribution to the biology of ageing by proposing the disposable soma theory of aging. He is currently a researcher and Associate Dean for Ageing in Newcastle University and he headed the Institute for Ageing and Health in its school of clinical medical sciences. He is the author of Time of Our Lives: The Science of Human Aging (1999), The End of Age: Why Everything About Aging Is Changing (2001), and co-author of Chance, Development, and Aging (2000, together with Caleb E. Finch). In 2001 he gave the annual Reith Lectures.

He also leads the Newcastle 85+ Study and on the theme of the continuing growth in human life expectancy he, on 16 March 2017, delivered a lecture entitled "Why and how are we living longer?" to Manchester Literary & Philosophical Society notes of it may be viewed

Kirkwood was appointed Commander of the Order of the British Empire (CBE) in the 2009 New Year Honours. He was elected a Fellow of the Academy of Medical Sciences in 2001.
