= Antagonistic pleiotropy hypothesis =

Proposed evolutionary explanation for senescence

The antagonistic pleiotropy hypothesis (APT) is a theory in evolutionary biology that holds that certain genes confer beneficial effects early in an organism's life, enhancing survival or fertility, while also causing detrimental effects later in life. APT provides an explanation for why some genes are not eliminated by natural selection even though they are associated with catastrophic health outcomes, especially in older age (e.g. Alzheimer's disease or sickle cell anaemia).

APT was first proposed in a 1952 paper on the evolutionary theory of aging by Peter Medawar and developed further in a paper by George C. Williams in 1957 as an explanation for senescence. Pleiotropy is the phenomenon where a single gene influences more than one phenotypic trait in an organism. It is one of the most commonly observed attributes of genes. A gene is considered to exhibit antagonistic pleiotropy if it controls more than one phenotypic trait, where at least one of these traits is beneficial to the organism's fitness and at least one is detrimental to fitness.

This line of genetic research attempts to answer the following question: if survival and reproduction should always be favoured by natural selection, why should ageing – which in evolutionary terms can be described as the age-related decline in survival rate and reproduction – be nearly ubiquitous in the natural world?" The antagonistic pleiotropy hypothesis provides a partial answer to this question. As an evolutionary explanation for ageing, the hypothesis relies on the fact that reproductive capacity declines with age in many species and that, therefore, the strength of natural selection also declines with age (because there can be no natural selection without reproduction). Since the strength of selection declines over the life cycles of human and most other organisms, natural selection in these species does not eliminate "alleles that have early beneficial effects, but later deleterious effects".

Antagonistic pleiotropy also provides a framework for understanding why many genetic disorders, even those causing life threatening health impacts (e.g. sickle cell anaemia), are found to be relatively prevalent in populations. Seen through the lens of simple evolutionary processes, these genetic disorders should be observed at very low frequencies due to the force of natural selection. Genetic models of populations show that antagonistic pleiotropy allows genetic disorders to be maintained at reasonably high frequencies "even if the fitness benefits are subtle". In this sense, antagonistic pleiotropy forms the basis of a "genetic trade-off between different fitness components."

== Trade-offs ==
In the theory of evolution, the concept of fitness has two components: survival and reproduction. Antagonistic pleiotropy gets fixed in genomes by creating viable trade-offs between or within these two components. The existence of these trade-offs has been clearly demonstrated in human, botanical and insect species. For example, an analysis of global gene expression in the fruit fly, Drosophila melanogaster, revealed 34 genes whose expression coincided with the genetic trade-off between larval survival and adult size. The joint expression of these candidate 'trade-off' genes explained 86.3% of the trade-off. These tradeoffs can result from selection at the level of the organism or, more subtly, via mechanisms for the allocation of scarce resources in cellular metabolism.

Another example is found in a study of the yellow monkey flower, an annual plant. The study documents a trade-off between days-to-flower and reproductive capacity. This genetic balancing act determines how many individuals survive to flower in a short growing season (viability) while also influencing the seed set of survivors (fecundity). The authors find that tradeoffs between plant viability and fecundity can engender a stable polymorphism under surprisingly general conditions. Thus, for this annual flower, they reveal a tradeoff between mortality and fecundity and, according to the authors, this tradeoff is also relevant for other annual, flowering plants.

=== Role in fecundity and senescence ===
Senescence refers to the process of physiological change in individual members of a species as they age. An antagonistically pleiotropic gene can be selected for if it has beneficial effects in early life while manifesting its negative effects in later life because genes tend to have larger impacts on fitness in an organism's prime than in their old age. Williams's 1957 article has motivated many follow-up studies on the evolutionary causes of ageing. These studies show clear trade-offs involving early increases in fecundity and later increases in mortality. For example, two experiments with Drosophila melanogaster have shown that increased fertility is associated with reduced longevity. Likewise, for humans, infertile women live longer on average than fertile women.

One such study tests the hypothesis that death due to cardiovascular disease in women is linked to an antagonistic pleiotropy operating through inflammation and linked to fertility. Because the human immune system evolved in an ancestral environment characterized by abundant pathogens, protective, pro-inflammatory responses (which helped individuals to avoid and survive infections) were undoubtedly selected for in these environments. However, in terms of cardiovascular risk, these same inflammatory responses have turned out to be harmful as the material conditions of human existence improved – in affluent countries, where life expectancy is much longer than in the ancestral environment, strong inflammatory responses carry greater risks of cardiovascular disease as individuals age. The study looks at mortality, over a period of 3 to 5 years, in a group of 311, 85-year old Dutch women. Information on their reproductive history as well the results of blood tests, genetic tests and physical examinations was recorded. The study found that individuals with a higher pro-inflammatory ratio TNFα/IL-10 had a significantly higher incidence of death due to cardiovascular disease in old age. It also linked specific alleles to a combination of higher fertility, stronger inflammatory response and greater cardiovascular problems in old age. This finding supports the hypothesis that this gene was prevalent because it helped women in the ancestral environment to more effectively combat infection during their reproductive years. However, the pleiotropic costs of the gene in terms of cardiovascular risks are now clear because people live long enough to die of cardiovascular disease.

=== Role in disease ===
The survival of many serious genetic disorders in human evolutionary history has led researchers to explore the role of antagonistic pleiotropy in disease. If genetic disorders are caused by mutations to a single deleterious allele, then natural selection should eliminate carriers of this allele over evolutionary time, thereby lowering the frequency of these mutations. Yet, research shows that the incidence of such alleles in studied populations is often stable and relatively high. In a 2011 review article, Carter and Nguyen discuss several genetic disorders, arguing that, far from being a rare phenomenon, antagonistic pleiotropy might be a fundamental mechanism by which "alleles with severe deleterious health effects can be maintained at medically relevant frequencies with only minor beneficial pleiotropic effects."

==== Alzheimer's disease and atherosclerosis ====
Some researchers consider the relatively high frequency in human populations of the APOE ε4 allele at the APOE locus as an example of antagonistic pleiotropy. APOE "is a major supplier of cholesterol precursor for the production of ovarian oestrogen and progesterone... ". APEO has therefore been identified as a gene that influences fertility. At the same time, it increases the risk of atherosclerosis and Alzheimer's disease with age. Why has not this allele, which is associated with extremely detrimental health incomes not been replaced by the APOE ε3 allele, which has beneficial health effects? The answer is that APOE ε4 appears to confer early‐life advantages in potential fertility, particularly in infectious environments. It also has been shown to have positive impacts on cognitive development in early life and protection against many cancers.

==== Sickle cell anaemia ====
Sickle cell anaemia has been identified as another example of APT. It results in an abnormality in the oxygen-carrying protein haemoglobin found in red blood cells. Possessors of the deleterious allele have much lower life expectancies, with homozygotes rarely reaching 50 years of age. However, this allele also enhances resistance to malaria. Thus, in regions where malaria exerts or has in the past exerted a strong selective pressure, sickle cell anaemia has been selected for its conferred partial resistance to the disease. While homozygotes will have either no protection from malaria or a dramatic propensity to sickle cell anemia (depending on which allelle they inherit), heterozygotes have fewer physiological effects and a partial resistance to malaria. Thus, the gene that is responsible for sickle cell disease has fixed itself with relatively high frequencies in populations threatened by malaria by engendering a viable tradeoff between death from this non-communicable disease and death from malaria.

==== Laron syndrome ====
In another study of genetic diseases, 99 individuals with Laron syndrome (a rare form of dwarfism) were monitored alongside their non-dwarf kin for a period of ten years. Patients with Laron syndrome possess one of three genotypes for the growth hormone receptor gene (GHR). Most patients have an A->G splice site mutation in position 180 in exon 6. Some others possess a nonsense mutation (R43X), while the rest are heterozygous for the two mutations. Laron syndrome patients experienced a lower incidence of cancer mortality and diabetes compared to their non-dwarf kin. This suggests a role for antagonistic pleiotropy, whereby a deleterious mutation is preserved in a population because it still confers some survival benefit.

==== Huntington's disease ====
Another instance of APT can be found in Huntington's disease, a rare neurodegenerative disorder characterised by a high number of CAG repeats within the Huntingtin gene. The onset of Huntington's is usually observed post-reproductive age and generally involves involuntary muscle spasms, cognitive difficulties and psychiatric problems. The high number of CAG repeats is associated with increased activity of p53, a tumor suppressing protein that participates in apoptosis. It has been hypothesized that this explains the lower rates of cancer among Huntington's patients. Huntington's disease is also correlated with high fecundity.

Other pleiotropic diseases include: beta-thalassemia (also protects against malaria in the heterozygous state); and osteoporosis in old age (reduced risk of osteoporosis in youth).

== Ubiquity in population genetics ==
Advances in genome mappings have greatly facilitated research into aging and antagonistic pleiotropy. Such research is often carried out in laboratories, though such settings do not capture the full set of influences on the evolution of wild populations. Studying wild populations has the advantage of introducing the full complexity of the selection experience – competitors, predators, and parasites – though it has the disadvantage of introducing idiosyncratic factors that are specific to given locations. In order to be able to assert with confidence that a given pleiotropy is, indeed, an antagonistic pleiotropy and not due to some other competing cause (e.g. the mutation accumulation hypothesis), one must have knowledge of the precise gene that is pleiotropic. This is now increasingly possible with organisms that have detailed genomic mappings (e.g. mice, fruit flies and humans). A 2018 review of this research finds that "antagonistic pleiotropy is somewhere between very common or ubiquitous in the animal world .... and potentially all living domains... ".

== See also ==
- Evolution of ageing
- Mutation accumulation theory
- Disposable soma theory of aging
