= Vitamin B3 =

Class of vitamins

Vitamin B_{3}
- Drug class
- Structure of nicotinamide, one of the vitamers of vitamin B_{3}

Class identifiers
- Use: Vitamin B_{3} deficiency
- ATC code: A11H
- Biological target: enzyme cofactor (all NAD-dependent enzymes)

Clinical data
- Drugs.com: Niacin

External links
- MeSH: D009536

Legal status

Vitamin B_{3}, colloquially referred to as niacin, is a vitamin family that includes three forms, or vitamers: nicotinic acid (niacin), nicotinamide (niacinamide), and nicotinamide riboside. All three forms of vitamin B_{3} are converted within the body to nicotinamide adenine dinucleotide (NAD). NAD is required for human life and people are unable to make it within their bodies without either vitamin B_{3} or tryptophan. Nicotinamide riboside was identified as a form of vitamin B_{3} in 2004.

Niacin (the nutrient) can be made by plants and animals from the amino acid tryptophan. Niacin is obtained in the diet from a variety of whole and processed foods, with highest contents in fortified packaged foods, meat, poultry, red fish such as tuna and salmon, lesser amounts in nuts, legumes and seeds. Niacin as a dietary supplement is used to treat pellagra, a disease caused by niacin deficiency. Signs and symptoms of pellagra include skin and mouth lesions, anemia, headaches, and tiredness. Many countries mandate its addition to wheat flour or other food grains, thereby reducing the risk of pellagra.

The amide nicotinamide is a component of the coenzymes nicotinamide adenine dinucleotide (NAD) and nicotinamide adenine dinucleotide phosphate (NADP+). Although nicotinic acid and nicotinamide are identical in their vitamin activity, nicotinamide does not have the same pharmacological, lipid-modifying effects or side effects as nicotinic acid, i.e., when nicotinic acid takes on the -amide group, it does not reduce cholesterol nor cause flushing. Nicotinamide is recommended as a treatment for niacin deficiency because it can be administered in remedial amounts without causing the flushing, considered an adverse effect. In the past, the group was loosely referred to as vitamin B_{3} complex.

Extra-terrestrial nicotinic acid and nicotinamide have been detected in carbonaceous chondrite meteorites and in sample-returns from the asteroids 162173 Ryugu and 101955 Bennu.

== Etymology ==
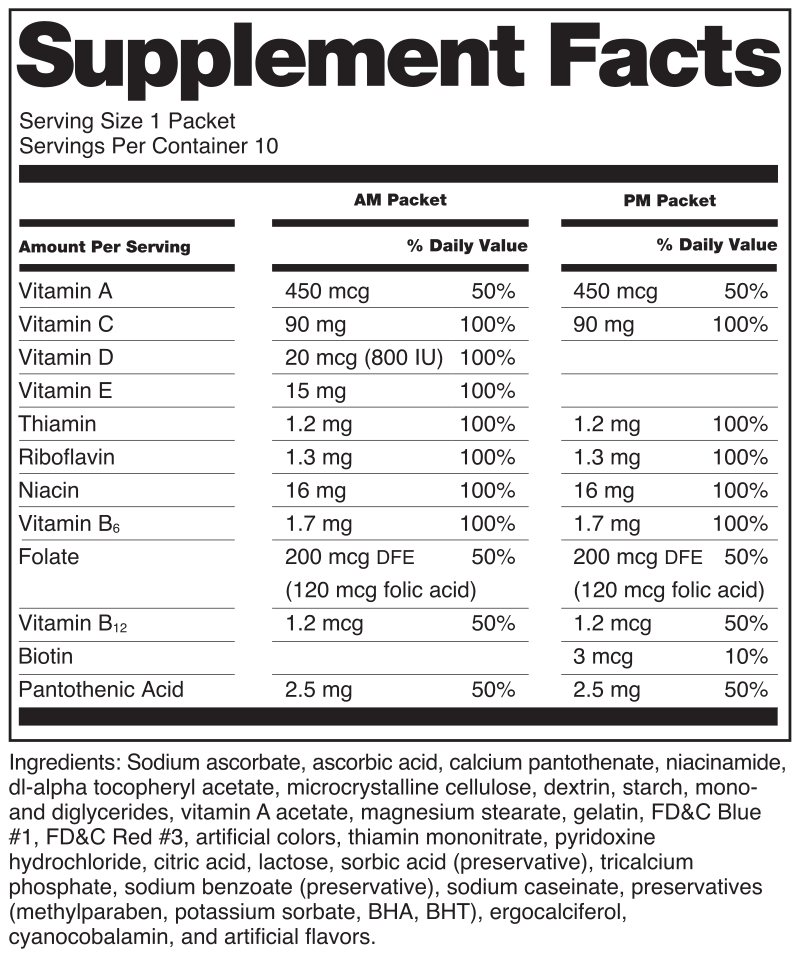
Example of a label showing the amount of niacin (Vitamin B3), and specifying to be niacinamide in the ingredient section.

As flour fortification started adding niacin in the US, the United States Government adopted the terms niacin (a shortened form of "nicotinic acid vitamin") and niacinamide in 1942 as alternate names for nicotinic acid and nicotinamide, respectively, and encouraged their use in nontechnical contexts to avoid the public confusing them with the nearly unrelated (and toxic) nicotine. The terms were incorporated into the United States Adopted Name dictionary that was created in 1961.

The term niacin was then adopted internationally by multiple institutions (WHO/FAO, EFSA, FDA, Anvisa) using a broader meaning including all dietary NAD precursors that can prevent signs of deficiency. In other words, the term is used with the same meaning as vitamin B_{3}, including not just nicotinic acid, but also nicotinamide, and nicotinamide riboside.

The term niacinamide failed to replace nicotinamide. Between 1942 and 2022, it has never surpassed nicotinamide in terms of occurrence in published books, according to Google Ngram Viewer.

== Mechanism of action ==
Nicotinamide adenine dinucleotide (NAD), along with its phosphorylated variant nicotinamide adenine dinucleotide phosphate (NADP), are utilized in transfer reactions within DNA repair and calcium mobilization. NAD also plays a critical role in human metabolism, acting as a coenzyme in both glycolysis and the Krebs cycle.

== Vitamin deficiency ==
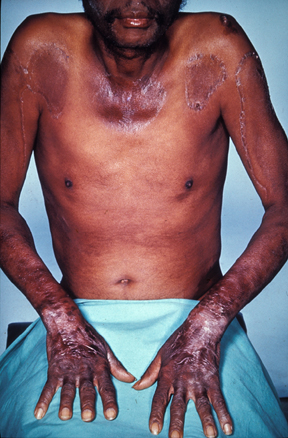
A man with pellagra, which is caused by a chronic lack of vitamin B_{3} in the diet

Severe vitamin B_{3} deficiency in the diet causes the disease pellagra, characterized by diarrhea, sun-sensitive dermatitis involving hyperpigmentation and thickening of the skin (see image), inflammation of the mouth and tongue, delirium, dementia, and if left untreated, death. Common psychiatric symptoms include irritability, poor concentration, anxiety, fatigue, loss of memory, restlessness, apathy, and depression. The biochemical mechanisms for the observed deficiency-caused neurodegeneration are not well understood, but may rest on: A) the requirement for nicotinamide adenine dinucleotide (NAD+) to suppress the creation of neurotoxic tryptophan metabolites; B) inhibition of mitochondrial ATP generation resulting in cell damage; C) activation of the poly (ADP-ribose) polymerase (PARP) pathway, as PARP is a nuclear enzyme involved in DNA repair, but in the absence of NAD+ can lead to cell death; D) reduced synthesis of neuro-protective brain-derived neurotrophic factor or its receptor tropomyosin receptor kinase B; or, E) changes to genome expression directly due to the niacin deficiency.

Niacin deficiency is rarely seen in developed countries, and it is more typically associated with poverty, malnutrition or malnutrition secondary to chronic alcoholism. It also tends to occur in areas where people eat maize (corn) as a staple food, as maize is low in digestible niacin. A cooking technique called nixtamalization, that is, pretreating with alkali ingredients, increases the bioavailability of niacin during maize meal or flour production. For this reason, people who consume corn as tortillas or hominy are at less risk of niacin deficiency.

For treating deficiency, the World Health Organization (WHO) recommends administering nicotinamide instead of nicotinic acid, to avoid the flushing side effect commonly caused by the latter. Guidelines suggest using 300 mg/day for three to four weeks. Dementia and dermatitis show improvement within a week. Because deficiencies of other B-vitamins may be present, the WHO recommends a multi-vitamin in addition to the nicotinamide.

Hartnup disease is a hereditary nutritional disorder resulting in niacin deficiency. It is named after an English family with a genetic disorder that resulted in a failure to absorb the essential amino acid tryptophan, tryptophan being a precursor for niacin synthesis. The symptoms are similar to pellagra, including red, scaly rash and sensitivity to sunlight. Oral nicotinic acid or nicotinamide is given as a treatment for this condition in doses ranging from 50 to 100 mg twice a day, with a good prognosis if identified and treated early. Niacin synthesis is also deficient in carcinoid syndrome, because of metabolic diversion of its precursor tryptophan to form serotonin.

=== Measuring vitamin status ===
Plasma concentrations of niacin and niacin metabolites are not useful markers of niacin status. Urinary excretion of the methylated metabolite N1-methyl-nicotinamide is considered reliable and sensitive. The measurement requires a 24-hour urine collection. For adults, a value of less than 5.8 μmol/day represent deficient niacin status and 5.8 to 17.5 μmol/day represents low. According to the World Health Organization, an alternative mean of expressing urinary N1-methyl-nicotinamide is as mg/g creatinine in a 24-hour urine collection, with deficient defined as <0.5, low 0.5-1.59, acceptable 1.6-4.29, and high >4.3 Niacin deficiency occurs before the signs and symptoms of pellagra appear. Erythrocyte nicotinamide adenine dinucleotide (NAD) concentrations potentially provide another sensitive indicator of niacin depletion, although definitions of deficient, low and adequate have not been established. Lastly, plasma tryptophan decreases on a low niacin diet because tryptophan converts to nicotinic acid mononucleotide (NaMN) and then to NAD by the kynurenine pathway. However, low tryptophan could also be caused by a diet low in this essential amino acid, so it is not specific to confirming vitamin status.

== Dietary recommendations ==
Dietary recommendations

Australia and New Zealand
Age group	RDI for niacin (mg NE/day)	Upper level of intake
Infants 0–6 months	2 mg/d preformed niacin*	ND
Infants 7–12 months	4 mg/d NE*	ND
1–3	6	10
4–8	8	15
9–13	12	20
14–18	–	30
19+	–	35
Females 14+	14	–
Males 14+	16	–
Pregnant females 14–50	18	–
Pregnant females 14–18	–	30
Pregnant females 19–50	–	35
Lactating females 14–50	17	–
Lactating females 14–18	–	30
Lactating females 19–50	–	35
* Adequate Intake for infants

Canada
Age group (years)	RDA of niacin (mg NE/d)	Tolerable upper intake level
0–6 months	2 mg/d preformed niacin*	ND
7–12 months	4 mg/d NE*	ND
1–3	6	10
4–8	8	15
9–13	12	20
Females 14–18	14	30
Males 14–18	16	30
Females 19+	14	35
Males 19+	16	35
Pregnant females <18	18	30
Pregnant females 18–50	18	35
Lactating females <18	17	30
Lactating females 18–50	17	35

European Food Safety Authority
Gender	Adequate Intake (mg NE/MJ)	
Females	1.3	
Males	1.6	
Age (years)	Tolerable upper limit of Nicotinic acid (mg/day)	Tolerable upper limit of Nicotinamide (mg/day)
1–3	2	150
4–6	3	220
7–10	4	350
11–14	6	500
15–17	8	700

United States
Age group	RDA for niacin (mg NE/day)	Tolerable upper intake level
Infants 0–6 months	2*	ND**
Infants 6–12 months	4*	ND**
1–3	6	10
4–8	8	15
9–13	12	20
Females 14–18	14	30
Males 14–18	16	30
Females 19+	14	35
Males 19+	16	35
Pregnant females 14–18	18	30
Pregnant females 19–50	18	35
Lactating females 14–18	17	30
Lactating females 19–50	17	35
* Adequate intake for infants, as an RDA has yet to be established ** Not possible to establish; source of intake should be formula and food only

The U.S. Institute of Medicine (renamed National Academy of Medicine in 2015) updated Estimated Average Requirements (EARs) and Recommended Dietary Allowances (RDAs) for niacin in 1998, as well as Tolerable upper intake levels (ULs). In lieu of an RDA, Adequate Intakes (AIs) are identified for populations for which there is not enough evidence to identify a dietary intake level that is sufficient to meet the nutrient requirements of most people. (see table).

The European Food Safety Authority (EFSA) refers to the collective set of information as Dietary Reference Values (DRV), with Population Reference Intake (PRI) instead of RDA, and Average Requirement instead of EAR. For the EU, AIs and ULs have the same definition as in the US, except that units are milligrams per megajoule (MJ) of energy consumed rather than mg/day. For women (including those pregnant or lactating), men and children the PRI is 1.6 mg per megajoule. As the conversion is 1 MJ = 239 kcal, an adult consuming 2390 kilocalories should be consuming 16 mg niacin. This is comparable to US RDAs (14 mg/day for adult women, 16 mg/day for adult men).

ULs are established by identifying amounts of vitamins and minerals that cause adverse effects, and then selecting as an upper limit amounts that are the "maximum daily intake unlikely to cause adverse health effects". Regulatory agencies from different countries do not always agree. For the US, 30 or 35 mg of niacin for teenagers and adults, less for children. The EFSA UL for adults is set at 10 mg/day for nicotinic acid to avoid the skin flush reaction, and 900 mg/day for nicotinamide that doesn't cause flushing.

Both the DRI and DRV describe amounts needed as niacin equivalents (NE), calculated as 1 mg NE = 1 mg niacin or 60 mg of the essential amino acid tryptophan. This is because the amino acid is utilized to synthesize the vitamin.

For U.S. food and dietary supplement labeling purposes, the amount in a serving is expressed as a percent of Daily Value (%DV). For niacin labeling purposes 100% of the Daily Value is 16 mg. Prior to May 27, 2016, it was 20 mg, revised to bring it into agreement with the RDA. Compliance with the updated labeling regulations was required by January 1, 2020, for manufacturers with US$10 million or more in annual food sales, and by January 1, 2021, for manufacturers with lower volume food sales. A table of the old and new adult daily values is provided at Reference Daily Intake.

== Sources ==
Niacin is found in a variety of whole and processed foods, including fortified packaged foods, meat from various animal sources, seafoods, and spices. In general, animal-sourced foods provide about 5–10 mg niacin per serving, although dairy foods and eggs have little. Some plant-sourced foods such as nuts, legumes and grains provide about 2–5 mg niacin per serving, although in some grain products this naturally present niacin is largely bound to polysaccharides and glycopeptides, making it only about 30% bioavailable. Fortified food ingredients such as wheat flour have niacin added, which is bioavailable. Among whole food sources with the highest niacin content per 100 grams:

Source	Amount (mg / 100g)
Nutritional yeast Serving = 2 Tbsp (16 g) contains 56 mg	350
Tuna, yellowfin	22.1
Peanuts	14.3
Peanut butter	13.1
Bacon	10.4
Tuna, light, canned	10.1
Salmon	10.0
Turkey depending on what part, how cooked	7–12
Chicken depending on what part, how cooked	7–12

Source	Amount (mg / 100g)
Beef depending on what part, how cooked	4–8
Pork depending on what part, how cooked	4–8
Sunflower seeds	7.0
Tuna, white, canned	5.8
Almonds	3.6
Mushrooms, white	3.6
Cod fish	2.5
Rice, brown	2.5
Hot dogs	2.0

Source	Amount (mg / 100g)
Avocado	1.7
Potato, baked, with skin	1.4
Corn (maize)	1.0
Rice, white	0.5
Kale	0.4
Eggs	0.1
Milk	0.1
Cheese	0.1
Tofu	0.1

Vegetarian and vegan diets can provide adequate amounts if products such as nutritional yeast, peanuts, peanut butter, tahini, brown rice, mushrooms, avocado and sunflower seeds are included. Fortified foods and dietary supplements can also be consumed to ensure adequate intake.

=== Food preparation ===
Niacin naturally found in food is susceptible to destruction from high heat cooking, especially in the presence of acidic foods and sauces. It is soluble in water, and so may also be lost from foods boiled in water.

=== Food fortification ===
Countries fortify foods with nutrients to address known deficiencies. As of 2020, 54 countries required food fortification of wheat flour with nicotinic acid or nicotinamide; 14 also mandate fortification of maize flour, and 6 mandate fortification of rice. From country to country, niacin fortification ranges from 1.3 to 6.0 mg/100 g.

=== Determination in food ===
A number of chemical, physical, and microbiological ways can be used to determine niacin content in food. The colormetric method involves the König reaction with cyanogen bromide and can detect both the acid and the amide. The microbiological method uses a bacterium that relies on niacin for growth, such as Lactobacillus plantarum, and measures the extent of its growth. It can detect any form convertible to NAD+ by the bacterium (both the acid and the amide). An emerging method is isotope dilution mass spectrometry using deuterated nicotinic acid.

== Toxicity ==
The US Food and Nutrition Board has set a daily limit of 35 mg for vitamin B_{3}, unless under medical supervision. At daily doses of nicotinic acid as low as 30 mg, flushing has been reported, always starting in the face and sometimes accompanied by skin dryness, itching, paresthesia, and headache. (These effects do not occur with nicotinamide). Liver toxicity is the most serious toxic reaction and it occurs at doses >2 grams/day, and is possible with either nicotinic acid or nicotinamide. Fulminant hepatic failure has been reported in cases of niacin overdose at several grams per day. Other reactions include glucose intolerance, hyperuricemia, macular edema, and macular cysts.

== Preparations ==
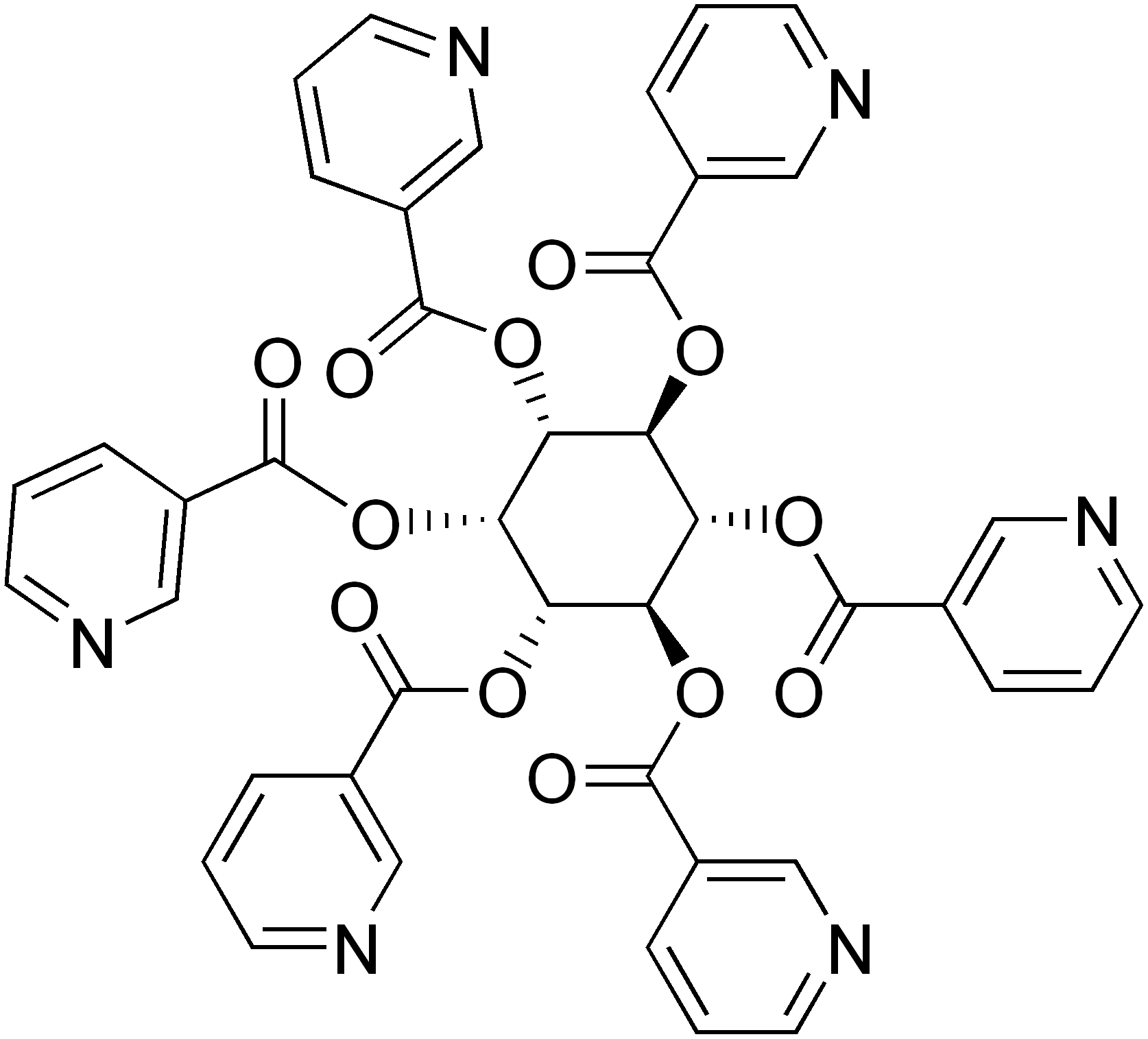
Inositol hexanicotinate

Niacin is incorporated into multi-vitamin and sold as a single-ingredient dietary supplement. The latter can be immediate or slow release. Nicotinamide is used to treat niacin deficiency and for supplementation because it does not cause the flushing adverse reaction seen with nicotinic acid. Nicotinamide may be toxic to the liver at doses exceeding 3 g/day for adults.

One form of dietary supplement sold in the US is inositol hexanicotinate (IHN), also called inositol nicotinate. This is inositol that has been esterified with niacin on all six of inositol's alcohol groups. IHN is usually sold as "flush-free" or "no-flush" niacin in units of 250, 500, or 1000 mg/tablets or capsules. In the US, it is sold as an over-the-counter formulation, and often is marketed and labeled as niacin, thus misleading consumers into thinking they are getting an active form of the medication. While this form of niacin does not cause the flushing associated with the immediate-release products, there is not enough evidence to recommend IHN to treat hyperlipidemia.

== History ==
Corn (maize) became a staple food in the southeast United States and in parts of Europe. A disease that was characterized by dermatitis of sunlight-exposed skin was described in Spain in 1735 by Gaspar Casal. He attributed the cause to poor diet. In northern Italy it was named pellagra from the Lombard language (agra = holly-like or serum-like; pell = skin). In time, the disease was more closely linked specifically to corn. In the US, Joseph Goldberger was assigned to study pellagra by the Surgeon General of the United States. His studies confirmed a corn-based diet as the culprit, but he did not identify the root cause.

Nicotinic acid was extracted from the liver by biochemist Conrad Elvehjem in 1937. He later identified the active ingredient, referring to it as "pellagra-preventing factor" and the "anti-blacktongue factor." It was also referred to as "vitamin PP", "vitamin P-P" and "PP-factor", all derived from the term "pellagra-preventive factor". In the late 1930s, studies by Tom Douglas Spies, Marion Blankenhorn, and Clark Cooper confirmed that nicotinic acid cured pellagra in humans. The prevalence of the disease was greatly reduced as a result.

In 1942, when flour enrichment with nicotinic acid began, a headline in the popular press said "Tobacco in Your Bread." In response, the Council on Foods and Nutrition of the American Medical Association approved of the Food and Nutrition Board's new names niacin and niacin amide for use primarily by non-scientists. It was thought appropriate to choose a name to dissociate nicotinic acid from nicotine, to avoid the perception that vitamins or niacin-rich foods contain nicotine, or that cigarettes contain vitamins. The resulting name niacin was derived from nicotinic acid + vitamin.

J. Laguna and K.J. Carpenter found in 1951, that niacin in corn is biologically unavailable and can be released only in very alkaline lime water of pH 11. This explains why a Latin-American culture that used alkali-treated (nixtamalized) cornmeal to make tortilla was not at risk for niacin deficiency. The modern explanation is that alkali treatment enhances the bioavailability of tryptophan, not directly any form of niacin.

== Extra-terrestrial occurrence ==
Extra-terrestrial vitamin B3 vitamers have been found in carbonaceous chondrite meteorites and in sample-returns from the asteroids 162173 Ryugu and 101955 Bennu.

Vitamin B3 vitamers from extra-terrestrial sources
Asteroid	Nicotinic acid	Nicotinamide
101955 Bennu	0.43 nmol/g	not reported
162173 Ryugu	0.40 nmol/g, 99ppb	not detected
Meteorite	Nicotinic acid	Nicotinamide
Orgueil	715ppb	214ppb
Murray	626ppb	65ppb
Murchison	2.4 nmol/g, 190ppb	16ppb
Tagish Lake	108ppb	5ppb
