= C7H8N2O2 =

The molecular formula C_{7}H_{8}N_{2}O_{2} may refer to:

- N^{1}-Methyl-2-pyridone-5-carboxamide
- N^{1}-Methyl-4-pyridone-3-carboxamide
