= Casal collar =

Medical condition

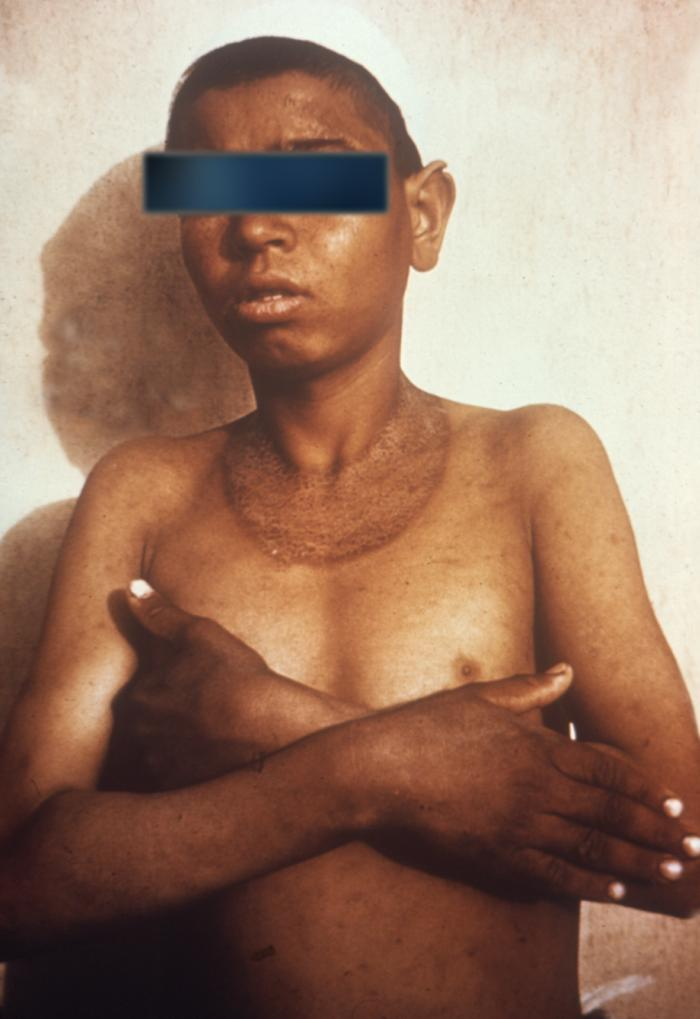
- A boy with casal collar caused by pellagra
- Specialty: Dermatology
- Symptoms: Redness and darkening around neck
- Causes: Pellagra
- Differential diagnosis: Seborrheic dermatitis

The Casal collar or Casal necklace is a medical sign in which there is a redness and darkening of the skin around the neck, seen in people with pellagra. It becomes prominent following exposure to sun, and can be itchy with a burning feeling and pain. It can blister and weep, and turn into thick dark skin, with a coppery hue. If prolonged, the skin becomes thin, dry and smooth.

The sign is caused by a lack of the niacin (vitamin B_{3}). Seborrheic dermatitis may appear similar.

Casal collar is named after Gaspar Casal.
