= Nicotinic acid =

Vitamer of Vitamin B3

Kekulé, skeletal formula of nicotinic acid
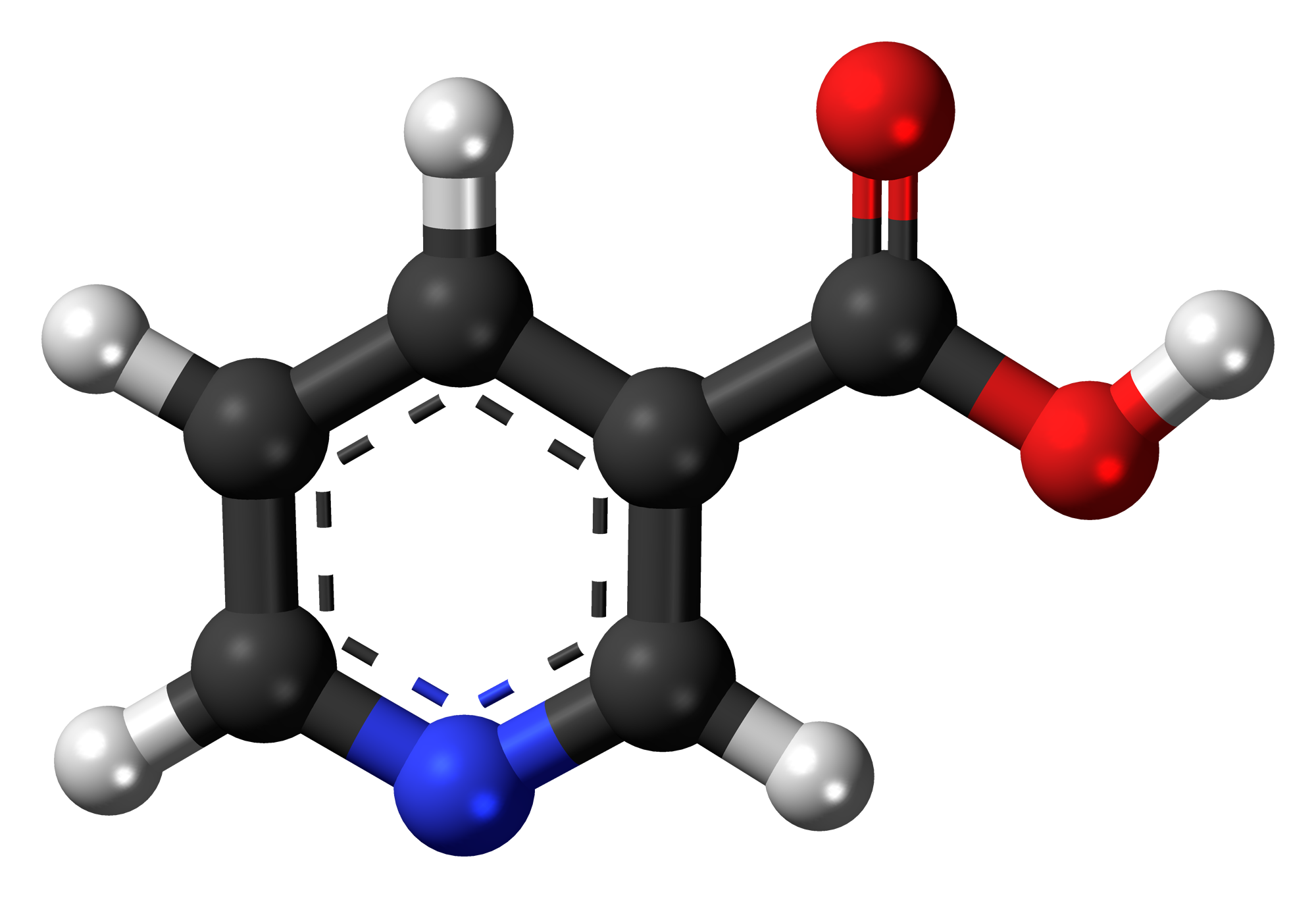
Ball and stick model of nicotinic acid

Names
Pronunciation	/ˈnaɪəsɪn/
- Preferred IUPAC name Pyridine-3-carboxylic acid
- Other names: Niacin (USAN US); Bionic; Vitamin B_{3}; Vitamin PP

Identifiers
CAS Number	59-67-6
3D model (JSmol)	Interactive image
Beilstein Reference	109591
ChEBI	CHEBI:15940
ChEMBL	ChEMBL573
ChemSpider	913
DrugBank	DB00627
ECHA InfoCard	100.000.401
EC Number	200-441-0
Gmelin Reference	3340
IUPHAR/BPS	1588
KEGG	D00049; C00253
MeSH	Niacin
PubChem CID	938
RTECS number	QT0525000
UNII	2679MF687A
CompTox Dashboard (EPA)	DTXSID1020932
- InChI: InChI=1S/C6H5NO2/c8-6(9)5-2-1-3-7-4-5/h1-4H,(H,8,9) Key: PVNIIMVLHYAWGP-UHFFFAOYSA-N; InChI=1/C6H5NO2/c8-6(9)5-2-1-3-7-4-5/h1-4H,(H,8,9) Key: PVNIIMVLHYAWGP-UHFFFAOYAA
- SMILES: OC(=O)c1cccnc1

Properties
Chemical formula	C_{6}H_{5}NO_{2}
Molar mass	123.111 g·mol^{−1}
Appearance	White, translucent crystals
Density	1.473 g cm^{−3}
Melting point	237 °C; 458 °F; 510 K
Solubility in water	18 g L^{−1}
log P	0.219
Acidity (pK_{a})	2.0, 4.85
Isoelectric point	4.75
Refractive index (n_{D})	1.4936
Dipole moment	0.1271305813 D

Thermochemistry
Std enthalpy of formation (Δ_{f}H^{⦵}_{298})	−344.9 kJ mol^{−1}
Std enthalpy of combustion (Δ_{c}H^{⦵}_{298})	−2.73083 MJ mol^{−1}

Pharmacology
ATC code	C04AC01 (WHO) C10BA01 (WHO) C10AD02 (WHO) C10AD52 (WHO)
License data	EU EMA: by Nicotinic acid
Routes of administration	Intramuscular, by mouth
- Pharmacokinetics
Biological half-life	20–45 min

Hazards
- GHS labelling
Pictograms	(GHS07: Exclamation mark)
Signal word	Warning
Hazard statements	H319
Precautionary statements	P264, P280, P305+P351+P338, P337+P313, P501
NFPA 704 (fire diamond)	1 1 0
Flash point	193 °C (379 °F; 466 K)
Autoignition temperature	365 °C (689 °F; 638 K)
- Except where otherwise noted, data are given for materials in their standard state (at 25 °C [77 °F], 100 kPa). verify (what is ?) Infobox references

Nicotinic acid INN: Nicotinic acid
Clinical data
- Trade names: Niacor, Niaspan, others
- AHFS/Drugs.com: Monograph
- MedlinePlus: a682518
- License data: US DailyMed: Niacin
- Pregnancy category: AU: Exempt
- Routes of administration: Intramuscular, by mouth

Legal status
- Legal status: US: OTC / Rx-only

Identifiers
- PDB ligand: NIO (PDBe, RCSB PDB)
- CompTox Dashboard (EPA): DTXSID1020932
- ECHA InfoCard: 100.000.401

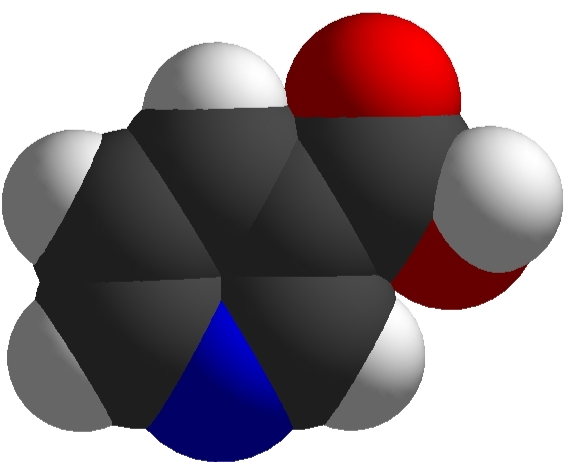
Space-filling model of nicotinic acid

Nicotinic acid, (Note: International nonproprietary name) or niacin, (Note: Common name in the United States (USAN)) is an organic compound and a vitamer of vitamin B_{3}, an essential human nutrient. It is produced by plants and animals from the amino acid tryptophan.

Nicotinic acid is also a prescription medication. Amounts far in excess of the recommended dietary intake for vitamin functions will lower blood triglycerides and low density lipoprotein cholesterol (LDL-C), and raise blood high density lipoprotein cholesterol (HDL-C, often referred to as "good" cholesterol). There are two forms: immediate-release and sustained-release nicotinic acid. Initial prescription amounts are 500 mg/day, increased over time until a therapeutic effect is achieved. Immediate-release doses can be as high as 3,000 mg/day; sustained-release as high as 2,000 mg/day. Despite the proven lipid changes, nicotinic acid has not been found useful for decreasing the risk of cardiovascular disease in those already prescribed a statin drug. A 2010 review had concluded that nicotinic acid was effective as a mono-therapy, but a 2017 review incorporating twice as many trials concluded that prescription nicotinic acid, while affecting lipid levels, did not reduce all-cause mortality, cardiovascular mortality, myocardial infarctions, nor fatal or non-fatal strokes. Prescription nicotinic acid was shown to cause hepatotoxicity and increase risk of type 2 diabetes. Nicotinic acid prescriptions in the United States had peaked in 2009 at 9.4 million, declining to 800 thousand by 2020. In 2023, it was the 288th most commonly prescribed medication in the US, with more than 500,000 prescriptions.

Nicotinic acid has the formula C_{6}H_{5}NO_{2} and belongs to the group of the pyridinecarboxylic acids. As the precursor for nicotinamide adenine dinucleotide and nicotinamide adenine dinucleotide phosphate, it is involved in DNA repair.

Extra-terrestrial nicotinic acid has been found in carbonaceous chondrite meteorites and in sample-returns from the asteroids 162173 Ryugu and 101955 Bennu.

== Definition ==
The term "niacin" was originally coined from "nicotinic acid vitamin", with the goal of distancing the nutrient B3 from the drug nicotine in tobacco. As a result, it originally referred to the nutritional entity of vitamin B_{3}. However, in American English, the term has also come to mean "nicotinic acid" in the context of high-dose use as a prescription medicine. In other varieties of English, the medicine is only ever called "nicotinic acid". The term "nicotinic acid" unambiguously refers to the substance and the prescription medicine containing it, which treats elevated cholesterol and triglycerides. When used as a drug, daily doses range from 500 to 3,000 mg/day. High-dose nicotinamide does not have this medicinal effect.

== Biological functions ==
Vitamin B_{3} has several vitamers that can act in place of each other, including nicotinic acid and nicotinamide. It is precursor of the coenzymes nicotinamide adenine dinucleotide (NAD) and nicotinamide adenine dinucleotide phosphate (NADP). These compounds are coenzymes for many dehydrogenases, participating in many hydrogen transfer processes. NAD is important in catabolism of fat, carbohydrate, protein, and alcohol, as well as cell signaling and DNA repair, and NADP mostly in anabolism reactions such as fatty acid and cholesterol synthesis. Vitamin intake recommendations made by several countries are that intakes of 14–18 mg/day are sufficient to meet the needs of healthy adults. Nicotinic acid and nicotinamide are both used for prevention and treatment of pellagra, a disease caused by lack of the vitamin.

== As a dietary supplement ==
In the United States, nicotinic acid is sold as a non-prescription dietary supplement with a range of 100 to 1000 mg per serving. These products often have a Structure/Function health claim allowed by the US Food & Drug Administration (FDA). An example would be "Supports a healthy blood lipid profile." The American Heart Association strongly advises against the substitution of dietary supplement nicotinic acid for prescription nicotinic acid because of potentially serious side effects, which means that nicotinic acid should only be used under the supervision of a health care professional, and because manufacture of dietary supplement nicotinic acid is not as well-regulated by the FDA as prescription nicotinic acid. More than 30 mg nicotinic acid consumed as a dietary supplement can cause skin flushing. Face, arms and chest skin turns a reddish color because of vasodilation of small subcutaneous blood vessels, accompanied by sensations of heat, tingling and itching. These signs and symptoms are typically transient, lasting minutes to hours; they are considered unpleasant rather than toxic.

== As lipid-modifying medication ==
Prescription nicotinic acid, commonly labeled as niacin in the United States, is available in immediate-release and slow-release formulations. It is used to treat primary hyperlipidemia and hypertriglyceridemia. It is used either as a monotherapy or in combination with other lipid-modifying drugs. Dosages start at 500 mg/day and are often gradually increased to as high as 3000 mg/day for immediate release or 2000 mg/day for slow release (also referred to as sustained release) to achieve the targeted lipid changes (lower LDL-C and triglycerides, and higher HDL-C). Prescriptions in the US peaked in 2009, at 9.4 million and had declined to 800 thousand by 2020. In 2023, it was the 288th most commonly prescribed medication in the United States, with more than 500,000 prescriptions.

Systematic reviews found no effect of prescription nicotinic acid on all-cause mortality, cardiovascular mortality, myocardial infarctions, nor fatal or non-fatal strokes despite raising HDL cholesterol in patients already taking statins. Reported side effects include an increased risk of new-onset type 2 diabetes.

=== Mechanisms ===
Nicotinic acid reduces synthesis of low-density lipoprotein cholesterol (LDL-C), very low-density lipoprotein cholesterol (VLDL-C), lipoprotein(a) and triglycerides, and increases high-density lipoprotein cholesterol (HDL-C). The lipid-therapeutic effects of nicotinic acid are partly mediated through the activation of G protein-coupled receptors, including hydroxycarboxylic acid receptor 2 (HCA_{2})and hydroxycarboxylic acid receptor 3 (HCA_{3}), which are highly expressed in body fat. HCA_{2} and HCA_{3} inhibit cyclic adenosine monophosphate (cAMP) production and thus suppress the release of free fatty acids (FFAs) from body fat, reducing their availability to the liver to synthesize the blood-circulating lipids in question. A decrease in free fatty acids also suppresses liver expression of apolipoprotein C3 and PPARg coactivator-1b, thus increasing VLDL-C turnover and reducing its production. Nicotinic acid also directly inhibits the action of diacylglycerol O-acyltransferase 2 (DGAT2) a key enzyme for triglyceride synthesis.

The mechanism behind nicotinic acid increasing HDL-C is not totally understood, but seems to occur in various ways. Nicotinic acid increases apolipoprotein A1 levels by inhibiting the breakdown of this protein, which is a component of HDL particles. It also inhibits HDL-C hepatic uptake by suppressing production of the cholesterol ester transfer protein (CETP) gene. It stimulates the ABCA1 transporter in monocytes and macrophages and upregulates peroxisome proliferator-activated receptor gamma, resulting in reverse cholesterol transport.

=== Combined with statins ===
Extended release nicotinic acid was combined with lovastatin (Advicor), and with simvastatin (Simcor), as prescription drug combinations. The combination niacin/lovastatin was approved by the US Food and Drug Administration (FDA) in 2001. The combination niacin/simvastatin was approved by the FDA in 2008. Subsequently, large outcome trials using these nicotinic acid and statin therapies were unable to demonstrate incremental benefit of nicotinic acid beyond statin therapy alone. The FDA withdrew approval of both drugs in 2016. The reason given: "Based on the collective evidence from several large cardiovascular outcome trials, the Agency has concluded that the totality of the scientific evidence no longer supports the conclusion that a drug-induced reduction in triglyceride levels and/or increase in HDL-cholesterol levels in statin-treated patients results in a reduction in the risk of cardiovascular events." The drug company discontinued the drugs.

=== Contraindications ===
Prescription immediate release (Niacor) and extended release (Niaspan) nicotinic acid are contraindicated for people with either active or a history of liver disease because both, but especially Niaspan, have been associated with instances of serious, on occasion fatal, liver failure. Both products are contraindicated for people with existing peptic ulcer disease, or other bleeding problems because nicotinic acid lowers platelet count and interferes with blood clotting. Both products are also contraindicated for women who are pregnant or expecting to become pregnant because safety during pregnancy has not been evaluated in human trials. These products are contraindicated for women who are lactating because it is known that nicotinic acid is excreted into human milk, but the amount and potential for adverse effects in the nursing infant are not known. Women are advised to either not nurse their child or discontinue the drug. High-dose nicotinic acid has not been tested or approved for use in children under 16 years.

=== Adverse effects ===
The most common adverse effects of medicinal nicotinic acid (500–3000 mg) are flushing (e.g., warmth, redness, itching or tingling) of the face, neck and chest, headache, abdominal pain, diarrhea, dyspepsia, nausea, vomiting, rhinitis, pruritus and rash. These can be minimized by initiating therapy at low dosages, increasing dosage gradually, and avoiding administration on an empty stomach.

The acute adverse effects of high-dose nicotinic acid therapy (1–3 grams per day) – which is commonly used in the treatment of hyperlipidemias – can further include hypotension, fatigue, glucose intolerance and insulin resistance, heartburn, blurred or impaired vision, and macular edema. With long-term use, the adverse effects of high-dose nicotinic acid therapy (750 mg per day) also include liver failure (associated with fatigue, nausea, and loss of appetite), hepatitis, and acute liver failure; these hepatotoxic effects of nicotinic acid occur more often when extended-release dosage forms are used. The long-term use of nicotinic acid at greater than or equal to 2 grams per day also significantly increases the risk of cerebral hemorrhage, ischemic stroke, gastrointestinal ulceration and bleeding, diabetes, dyspepsia, and diarrhea.

==== Flushing ====
Flushing – a short-term dilatation of skin arterioles, causing reddish skin color – usually lasts for about 15 to 30 minutes, although sometimes can persist for weeks. Typically, the face is affected, but the reaction can extend to neck and upper chest. The cause is blood vessel dilation due to elevation in prostaglandin GD_{2} (PGD2) and serotonin. Flushing was often thought to involve histamine, but histamine has been shown not to be involved in the reaction. Flushing is sometimes accompanied by a prickly or itching sensation, in particular, in areas covered by clothing.

Prevention of flushing requires altering or blocking the prostaglandin-mediated pathway. Aspirin taken half an hour before the nicotinic acid prevents flushing, as does ibuprofen. Taking nicotinic acid with meals also helps reduce this side effect. Acquired tolerance will also help reduce flushing; after several weeks of a consistent dose, most people no longer experience flushing. Slow- or "sustained"-release forms of nicotinic acid have been developed to lessen these side effects. Nicotinamide and inositol nicotinate can be used as no-flush forms of vitamin B_{3}, however the efficacy of the latter is dubious.

==== Liver damage ====
Nicotinic acid in medicinal doses can cause modest elevations in serum transaminase and unconjugated bilirubin, both biomarkers of liver injury. The increases usually resolve even when drug intake is continued. However, less commonly, the sustained release form of the drug can lead to serious hepatotoxicity, with onset in days to weeks. Early symptoms of serious liver damage include nausea, vomiting and abdominal pain, followed by jaundice and pruritus. The mechanism is thought to be a direct toxicity of elevated serum niacin. Lowering dose or switching to the immediate release form can resolve symptoms. In rare instances the injury is severe, and progresses to liver failure.

==== Diabetes ====
The high doses of nicotinic acid used to treat hyperlipidemia have been shown to elevate fasting blood glucose in people with type 2 diabetes. Long-term nicotinic acid therapy was also associated with an increase in the risk of new-onset type 2 diabetes.

==== Other adverse effects ====
High doses of nicotinic acid can also cause niacin maculopathy, a thickening of the macula and retina, which leads to blurred vision and blindness. This maculopathy is reversible after niacin intake ceases. Niaspan, the slow-release product, has been associated with a reduction in platelet content and a modest increase in prothrombin time.

== Pharmacology ==
=== Pharmacodynamics ===
Nicotinic acid activates the HCA_{2} receptor, which has effects in addition to lowering serum cholesterol and triglyceride concentrations: antioxidative, anti-inflammatory, antithrombotic, improved endothelial function and plaque stability, all of which counter development and progression of atherosclerosis.

Nicotinic acid inhibits cytochrome P450 enzymes CYP2E1, CYP2D6 and CYP3A4. Niacin produces a rise in serum unconjugated bilirubin in normal individuals and in those with Gilbert's Syndrome. However, in the Gilbert's Syndrome, the rise in bilirubin is higher and clearance is delayed longer than in normal people. One test used to aid in diagnosing Gilbert's Syndrome involves intravenous administration of nicotinic acid (niacin) in a dose of 50 mg over a period of 30 seconds.

=== Pharmacokinetics ===
Both nicotinic acid and nicotinamide are rapidly absorbed from the stomach and small intestine. Absorption is facilitated by sodium-dependent diffusion, and at higher intakes, via passive diffusion. Unlike some other vitamins, the percent absorbed does not decrease with increasing dose, so that even at amounts of 3-4 grams, absorption is nearly complete. With a one gram dose, peak plasma concentrations of 15 to 30 μg/mL are reached within 30 to 60 minutes. Approximately 88% of an oral pharmacologic dose is eliminated by the kidneys as unchanged nicotinic acid or nicotinuric acid, its primary metabolite. The plasma elimination half-life of nicotinic acid ranges from 20 to 45 minutes.

Nicotinic acid and nicotinamide are both converted into the coenzyme NAD. NAD converts to NADP by phosphorylation in the presence of the enzyme NAD+ kinase. High energy requirements (brain) or high turnover rate (gut, skin) organs are usually the most susceptible to their deficiency. In the liver, nicotinamide is converted to storage nicotinamide adenine dinucleotide (NAD). As needed, liver NAD is hydrolyzed to nicotinamide and nicotinic acid for transport to tissues, there reconverted to NAD to serve as an enzyme cofactor. Excess nicotinic acid is methylated in the liver to N^{1}-methylnicotinamide (NMN) and excreted in urine as such or as the oxidized metabolites N^{1}-methyl-2-pyridone-5-carboxamide and N1-Methyl-4-pyridone-3-carboxamide (2PY and 4PY). Decreased urinary content of these metabolites is a measure of niacin deficiency.

== Production ==
=== Biosynthesis ===
Nicotinic acid, serotonin (5-hydroxytryptamine), and melatonin biosynthesis from tryptophan

In addition to absorbing niacin from diet, nicotinic acid can be synthesized from the essential amino acid tryptophan, a five-step process with the penultimate compound being quinolinic acid (see figure). Some bacteria and plants utilize aspartic acid in a pathway that also goes to quinolinic acid. For humans, the efficiency of conversion is estimated as requiring 60 mg of tryptophan to make 1 mg of niacin. Riboflavin, vitamin B_{6} and iron are required for the process. Pellagra is a consequence of a corn-dominant diet because the niacin in corn is poorly bioavailable and corn proteins are low in tryptophan compared to wheat and rice proteins.

=== Industrial synthesis ===
Nicotinic acid was first synthesized in 1867 by oxidative degradation of nicotine with potassium chromate and sulfuric acid — this is the origin of the name. Nicotinic acid is prepared by hydrolysis of nicotinonitrile, which, as described above, is generated by oxidation of 3-picoline. Oxidation can be effected by air, but ammoxidation is more efficient. In the latter process, nicotinonitrile is produced by ammoxidation of 3-methylpyridine. Nitrile hydratase is then used to catalyze nicotinonitrile to nicotinamide, which can be sold directly or converted to nicotinic acid. Alternatively, ammonia, acetic acid and paraldehyde are used to make 5-ethyl-2-methyl-pyridine, which is then oxidized to nicotinic acid. New "greener" catalysts are being tested using manganese-substituted aluminophosphates that use acetyl peroxyborate as non-corrosive oxidant, avoiding producing nitrogen oxides as do traditional ammoxidations.

The demand for commercial production includes for animal feed and for food fortification meant for human consumption. According to Ullmann's Encyclopedia of Industrial Chemistry, worldwide 31,000 tons of nicotinamide were sold in 2014.

=== Climate impact ===
The production of nicotinic acid creates nitrous oxide as a by-product, which is a potent greenhouse gas. In 2018, it was discovered that a nicotinic acid factory in Visp, Switzerland, was responsible for around one percent of the country's greenhouse gas emissions. Eventually, catalytic scrubbing technology that eliminates most of the emissions was installed in 2021.

== Chemistry ==
This colorless, water-soluble solid is a derivative of pyridine, with a carboxyl group (COOH) at the 3-position. Other forms of vitamin B_{3} include the corresponding amide nicotinamide, where the carboxyl group has been replaced by a carboxamide group (CONH_{2}).

== Preparations ==
Prescription products can be immediate release (Niacor, 500 mg tablets) or extended release (Niaspan, 500 and 1000 mg tablets). Niaspan has a film coating that delays release of the nicotinic acid, resulting in an absorption over a period of 8–12 hours. This reduces vasodilation and flushing side effects, but increases the risk of hepatotoxicity compared to the immediate release drug.

Prescription nicotinic acid preparations in combination with statin drugs (discontinued) are described above. A combination of niacin and laropiprant had been approved for use in Europe and marketed as Tredaptive. Laropiprant is a prostaglandin D2 binding drug shown to reduce niacin-induced vasodilation and flushing side effects. A clinical trial showed no additional efficacy of Tredaptive in lowering cholesterol when used together with other statin drugs, but did show an increase in other side effects. The study resulted in the withdrawal of Tredaptive from the international market.

== History ==
Niacin as a chemical compound was first described by chemist Hugo Weidel in 1873 in his studies of nicotine, but that predated by many years the concept of food components other than protein, fat and carbohydrates that were essential for life. Vitamin nomenclature was initially alphabetical, with Elmer McCollum calling these fat-soluble A and water-soluble B. Over time, eight chemically distinct, water-soluble B vitamins were isolated and numbered, with niacin as vitamin B_{3}.

Corn (maize) became a staple food in the southeast United States and in parts of Europe. A disease that was characterized by dermatitis of sunlight-exposed skin was described in Spain in 1735 by Gaspar Casal. He attributed the cause to poor diet. In northern Italy it was named "pellagra" from the Lombard language (agra = holly-like or serum-like; pell = skin). In time, the disease was more closely linked specifically to corn. In the US, Joseph Goldberger was assigned to study pellagra by the Surgeon General of the United States. His studies confirmed a corn-based diet as the culprit, but he did not identify the root cause.

Nicotinic acid was extracted from liver by biochemist Conrad Elvehjem in 1937. He later identified the active ingredient, referring to it as "pellagra-preventing factor" and the "anti-blacktongue factor." It was also referred to as "vitamin PP", "vitamin P-P" and "PP-factor", all derived from the term "pellagra-preventive factor". In the late 1930s, studies by Tom Douglas Spies, Marion Blankenhorn, and Clark Cooper confirmed that nicotinic acid cured pellagra in humans. The prevalence of the disease was greatly reduced as a result. Nicotinic acid was initially synthesized by oxidizing nicotine with potassium chromate and sulfuric acid. Hence, in 1942, when flour enrichment with nicotinic acid began, a headline in the popular press said "Tobacco in Your Bread." In response, the Council on Foods and Nutrition of the American Medical Association approved of the Food and Nutrition Board's new names niacin and niacin amide for use primarily by non-scientists. It was thought appropriate to choose a name to dissociate nicotinic acid from nicotine, to avoid the perception that vitamins or niacin-rich food contains nicotine, or that cigarettes contain vitamins. The resulting name niacin was derived from nicotinic acid + vitamin.

Carpenter found in 1951, that niacin in corn is biologically unavailable, and can be released only in very alkaline lime water of pH 11. This explains why a Latin-American culture that used alkali-treated cornmeal to make tortilla was not at risk for niacin deficiency. The modern explanation is that alkali treatment enhances the bioavailability of tryptophan, not directly for any form of the vitamin.

In 1955, Altschul and colleagues described large amounts of nicotinic acid as having a lipid-lowering property. As such, niacin is the oldest known lipid-lowering drug. Lovastatin, the first 'statin' drug, was first marketed in 1987.

== Extra-terrestrial occurrence ==
Extra-terrestrial nicotinic acid has been found in carbonaceous chondrite meteorites and in sample-returns from the asteroids 162173 Ryugu and 101955 Bennu.

Vitamin B3 vitamers from extra-terrestrial sources
Asteroid	Nicotinic acid	Nicotinamide
101955 Bennu	0.43 nmol/g	not reported
162173 Ryugu	0.40 nmol/g, 99ppb	not detected
Meteorite	Nicotinic acid	Nicotinamide
Orgueil	715ppb	214ppb
Murray	626ppb	65ppb
Murchison	2.4 nmol/g, 190ppb	16ppb
Tagish Lake	108ppb	5ppb
