= Laropiprant =

Chemical compound

nicotinic acid / laropiprant
Combination of
- Nicotinic acid: Hypolipidemic agent
- Laropiprant: Prostaglandin receptor antagonist

Clinical data
- Trade names: Cordaptive, Tredaptive, Trevaclyn, Pelzont
- Other names: niacin/laropiprant (USAN US)
- AHFS/Drugs.com: UK Drug Information
- License data: EU EMA: by laropiprant
- Routes of administration: Oral
- ATC code: C10AD52 (WHO)

Legal status
- Legal status: Withdrawn

Identifiers
- CAS Number: 571170-77-9; + niacin: 1046050-73-0
- PubChem CID: 9867642; + niacin: 11948701
- DrugBank: DB11629
- ChemSpider: 8392225
- UNII: G7N11T8O78
- KEGG: D08940
- ChEBI: CHEBI:135942
- ChEMBL: ChEMBL426559
- CompTox Dashboard (EPA): DTXSID60205756
- ECHA InfoCard: 100.207.712

Chemical and physical data
- 3D model (JSmol): Interactive image
- SMILES: CS(=O)(=O)C1=CC(=CC2=C1N(C3=C2CC[C@@H]3CC(=O)O)CC4=CC=C(C=C4)Cl)F
- InChI: InChI=1S/C21H19ClFNO4S/c1-29(27,28)18-10-15(23)9-17-16-7-4-13(8-19(25)26)20(16)24(21(17)18)11-12-2-5-14(22)6-3-12/h2-3,5-6,9-10,13H,4,7-8,11H2,1H3,(H,25,26)/t13-/m1/s1; Key:NXFFJDQHYLNEJK-CYBMUJFWSA-N

Laropiprant

Clinical data
- Other names: MK-0524A
- AHFS/Drugs.com: International Drug Names
- ATC code: none

Legal status
- Legal status: Withdrawn

Identifiers
- IUPAC name: (−)-[(3R)-4-(4-chlorobenzyl)-7-fluoro-5-(methylsulfonyl)-1,2,3,4-tetrahydrocyclopenta[b]indol-3-yl]acetic acid
- CAS Number: 571170-77-9
- PubChem CID: 9867642
- IUPHAR/BPS: 3356
- ChemSpider: 8043333
- UNII: G7N11T8O78
- KEGG: D08940
- ChEMBL: ChEMBL426559
- CompTox Dashboard (EPA): DTXSID60205756
- ECHA InfoCard: 100.207.712

Chemical and physical data
- Formula: C_{21}H_{19}ClFNO_{4}S
- Molar mass: 435.89 g·mol^{−1}
- 3D model (JSmol): Interactive image
- SMILES: O=S(=O)(c1cc(F)cc2c1n(c3c2CC[C@@H]3CC(=O)O)Cc4ccc(Cl)cc4)C
- InChI: InChI=1S/C21H19ClFNO4S/c1-29(27,28)18-10-15(23)9-17-16-7-4-13(8-19(25)26)20(16)24(21(17)18)11-12-2-5-14(22)6-3-12/h2-3,5-6,9-10,13H,4,7-8,11H2,1H3,(H,25,26)/t13-/m1/s1; Key:NXFFJDQHYLNEJK-CYBMUJFWSA-N

Laropiprant (INN) was a drug used in combination with nicotinic acid to reduce blood cholesterol (LDL and VLDL) that is no longer sold, due to increases in side-effects with no cardiovascular benefit. Laropiprant itself has no cholesterol lowering effect, but it reduces facial flushes induced by nicotinic acid.

Merck & Co. planned to market this combination under the trade names Cordaptive in the US and Tredaptive in Europe. Both brands contained 1000 mg of nicotinic acid (niacin) and 20 mg of laropiprant in each tablet.

== Mechanism of action ==
Nicotinic acid in cholesterol lowering doses (500–2000 mg per day) causes facial flushes by stimulating biosynthesis of prostaglandin D_{2} (PGD_{2}), especially in the skin. PGD_{2} dilates the blood vessels via activation of the prostaglandin D_{2} receptor subtype DP_{1}, increasing blood flow and thus leading to flushes. Laropiprant acts as a selective DP_{1} receptor antagonist to inhibit the vasodilation of prostaglandin D_{2}-induced activation of DP_{1}.

Taking 325 mg of aspirin 20–30 minutes prior to taking nicotinic acid has also been proven to prevent flushing in 90% of patients, presumably by suppressing prostaglandin synthesis, but this medication also increases the risk of gastrointestinal bleeding, though the increased risk is less than 1 percent.

== History ==
In the mid-2000s, in a trial with 1613 patients, 10.2% patients stopped taking the medication in the combination drug group versus 22.2% under nicotinic acid monotherapy.

On April 28, 2008, the U.S. Food and Drug Administration (FDA) issued a "not approved" letter for Cordaptive. Tredaptive was approved by the European Medicines Agency (EMA) on July 3, 2008.

On January 11, 2013, Merck & Co Inc. announced they were withdrawing the drug worldwide as a result of European regulators recommendations.

The Heart Protection Study 2-Treatment of HDL to Reduce the Incidence of Vascular Events (HPS2-THRIVE) involved more than 25,000 adults. The treatment group received 2 g of extended-release nicotinic acid and 40 mg of laropiprant daily. Study results, reported in July 2014, showed that the combination of nicotinic acid and laropiprant did not have any beneficial effects when compared with a placebo treatment and had an increase in adverse effects.
