= Pellagra =

Human disease caused by a lack of vitamin B3

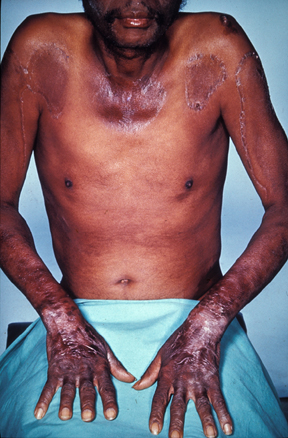
- The skin features of pellagra including peeling, redness, scaling, and thickening of sun-exposed areas.
- Specialty: Dermatology
- Symptoms: Inflammation of the skin, diarrhea, dementia, sores in the mouth
- Types: Primary, secondary
- Causes: Not enough niacin
- Diagnostic method: Based on symptoms
- Differential diagnosis: Kwashiorkor, pemphigus, photodermatitis, porphyria
- Prevention: Consuming Niacin
- Treatment: Nicotinic acid or nicotinamide supplementation.
- Prognosis: Good (with treatment), death in ~ 5 years (without treatment)
- Frequency: Rare (developed world), relatively common (developing world)

Pellagra is a disease caused by a lack of the vitamin niacin (vitamin B_{3}). Symptoms include inflamed skin, diarrhea, dementia, and sores in the mouth. Areas of the skin exposed to friction and radiation are typically affected first. Over time, affected skin may become darker, stiffen, peel, or bleed.

The two main types of pellagra are primary and secondary. Primary pellagra is due to a diet that does not contain enough niacin and tryptophan. Secondary pellagra is due to a poor ability to use the niacin within the diet. This can occur as a result of alcoholism, long-term diarrhea, carcinoid syndrome, Hartnup disease, and a number of medications such as isoniazid. Diagnosis is typically based on symptoms and may be assisted by urine testing.

Treatment is with either nicotinic acid or nicotinamide supplementation. Improvements typically begin within a few days. General improvements in diet are also frequently recommended. Decreasing sun exposure via sunscreen and proper clothing is important while the skin heals. Without treatment, death may occur. The disease occurs most commonly in the developing world, often as a disease of poverty associated with malnutrition, specifically sub-Saharan Africa.

== Etymology ==
The word "pellagra" is known to come from Lombardic, but its exact origins are disputed. "Pell" certainly arises from classical Latin pellis, meaning "skin". "-agra" may arise from Lombardic agra, meaning "like serum or holly juice", or the Latinate -agra, a suffix for maladies itself borrowed from the Greek ἄγρα, meaning "a catch-point, a hunting trap".

== Signs and symptoms ==
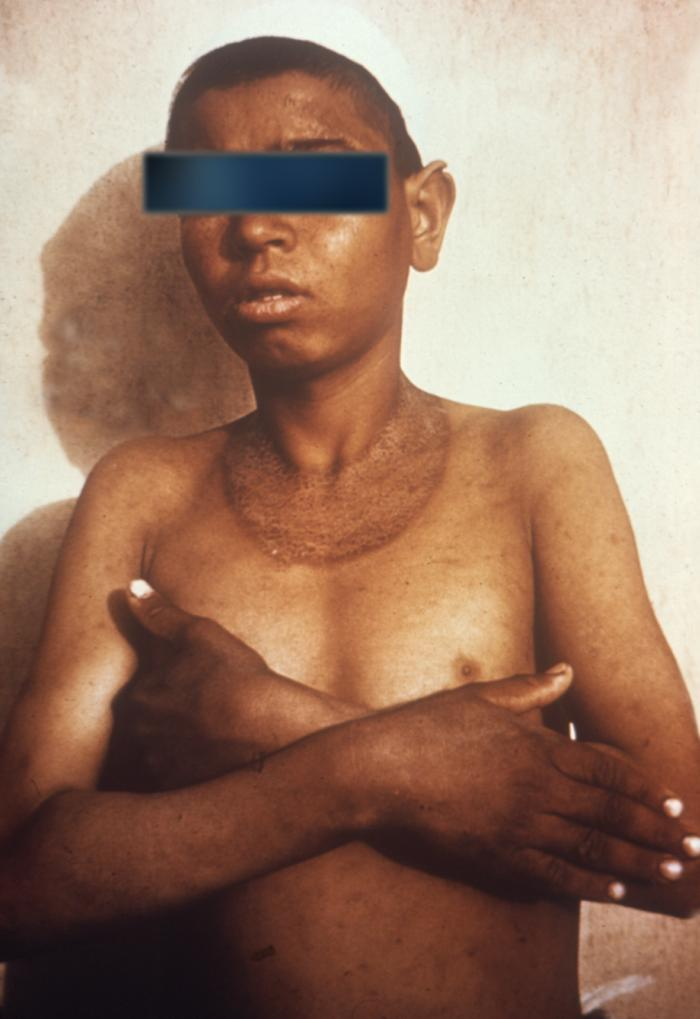
This child has the Casal collar skin rash around the neck associated with pellagra.

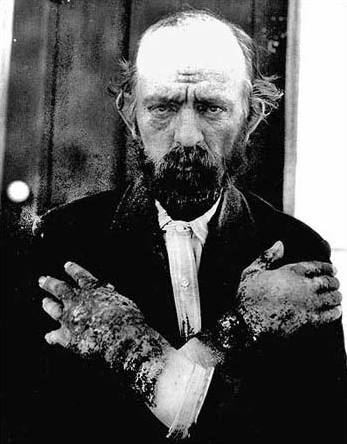
Man with pellagra with typical skin lesions

The classic symptoms of pellagra are diarrhea, dermatitis, dementia, and death (the four Ds).

A more comprehensive list of symptoms includes:

- Dermatitis (characteristic "broad collar" rash known as Casal collar)
- Hair loss
- Swelling
- Smooth, beefy red glossitis (tongue inflammation)
- Trouble sleeping
- Weakness
- Mental confusion or aggression
- Ataxia (lack of coordination), paralysis of extremities, peripheral neuritis (nerve damage)
- Diarrhea
- Dilated cardiomyopathy (enlarged, weakened heart)
- Sensitivity to radiation
- Eventually dementia

J. Frostigs and Tom Spies—according to Cleary and Cleary—described more specific psychological symptoms of pellagra as:

- Psychosensory disturbances (impressions as being painful, annoying bright lights, odors intolerance causing nausea and vomiting, dizziness after sudden movements),
- Psychomotor disturbances (restlessness, tense and a desire to quarrel, increased preparedness for motor action), as well as
- Emotional disturbances

Independently of clinical symptoms, blood level of tryptophan or urinary metabolites such as 2-pyridone/N-methylnicotinamide ratio less than two or NAD/NADP ratio in red blood cells can diagnose pellagra. The diagnosis is confirmed by rapid improvements in symptoms after doses of nicotinamide (250–500 mg/day) or nicotinamide-enriched food.

== Pathophysiology ==
Pellagra can develop according to several mechanisms, classically as a result of niacin (vitamin B_{3}) deficiency, which results in decreased nicotinamide adenine dinucleotide (NAD). Since NAD and its phosphorylated NADP form are cofactors required in many body processes, the pathological impact of pellagra is broad and results in death if not treated.

The first mechanism is simple dietary lack of niacin. Second, it may result from deficiency of tryptophan, an essential amino acid found in meat, poultry, fish, eggs, and peanuts, which the body uses to make niacin. Third, it may be caused by excess leucine, as it inhibits quinolinate phosphoribosyl transferase (QPRT) and inhibits the formation of nicotinic acid to nicotinamide mononucleotide (NMN) causing pellagra-like symptoms to occur.

Some conditions can prevent the absorption of dietary niacin or tryptophan and lead to pellagra. Inflammation of the jejunum or ileum can prevent nutrient absorption, leading to pellagra, and this can in turn be caused by Crohn's disease. Gastroenterostomy can also cause pellagra. Chronic alcoholism can also cause poor absorption, which combined with a diet already low in niacin and tryptophan produces pellagra. Hartnup disease is a genetic disorder that reduces tryptophan absorption, leading to pellagra.

Alterations in protein metabolism may also produce pellagra-like symptoms. An example is carcinoid syndrome, a disease in which neuroendocrine tumors along the gastrointestinal tract use tryptophan as the source for serotonin production, which limits the available tryptophan for niacin synthesis. In normal patients, only 1% of dietary tryptophan is converted to serotonin, but in patients with carcinoid syndrome, this value may increase to 70%. Carcinoid syndrome thus may produce niacin deficiency and clinical manifestations of pellagra. Antituberculosis medication tends to bind to vitamin B_{6} and reduce niacin synthesis, since B_{6} (pyridoxine) is a required cofactor in the tryptophan-to-niacin reaction.

Several therapeutic drugs can provoke pellagra. These include the antibiotics isoniazid, which decreases available B_{6} by binding to it and making it inactive, so it cannot be used in niacin synthesis, and chloramphenicol; the anticancer agent fluorouracil; and the immunosuppressant mercaptopurine.

== Treatment ==
If untreated, pellagra can kill within four or five years. Treatment is with nicotinamide, which has the same vitamin function as nicotinic acid and a similar chemical structure, but has lower toxicity. The frequency and amount of nicotinamide administered depends on the degree to which the condition has progressed.

== Epidemiology ==
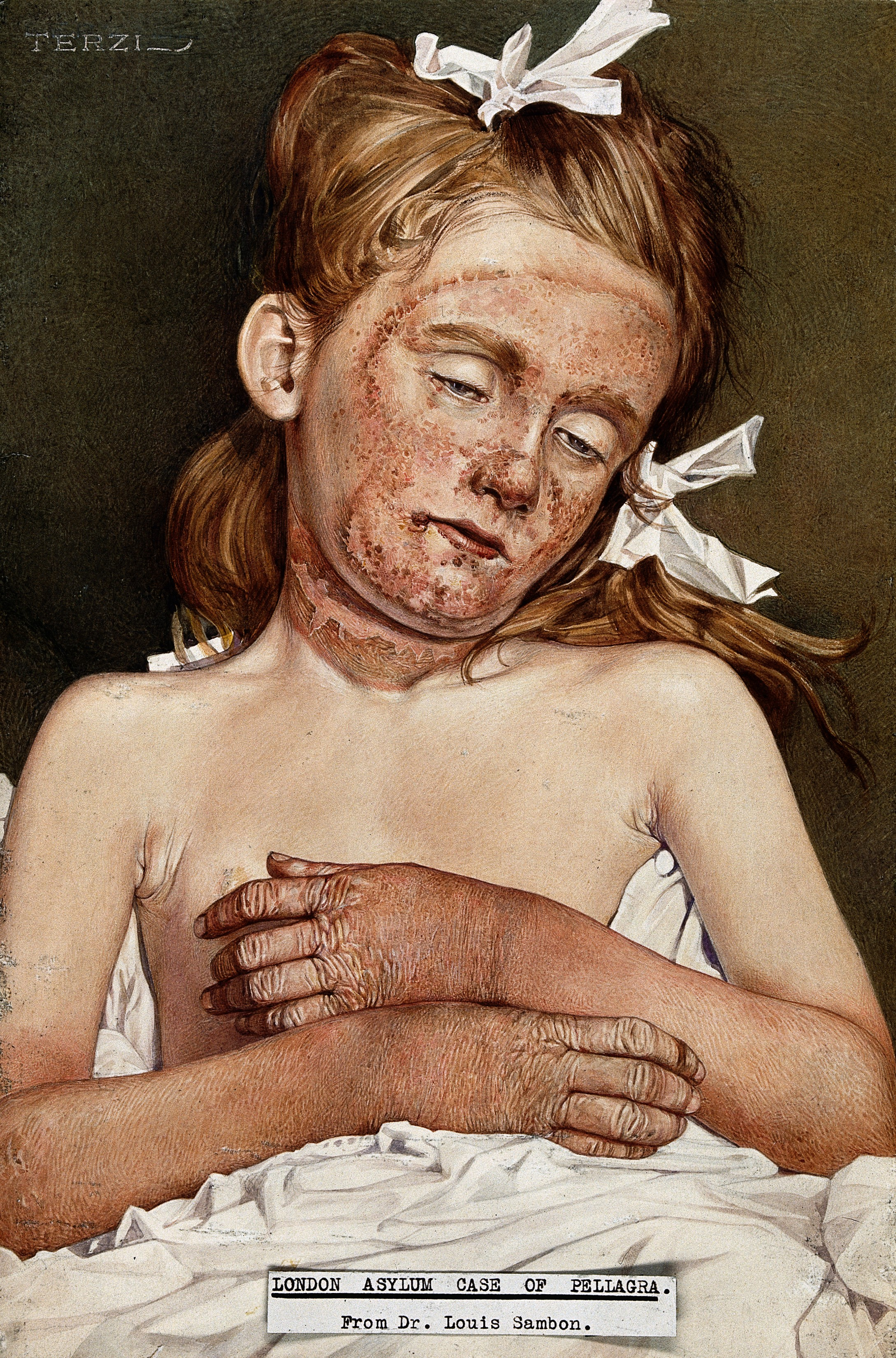
A girl in the London Asylum in 1925

Pellagra can be common in people who obtain most of their food energy from corn, notably rural South America, where maize is a staple food. If maize is not nixtamalized, it is a poor source of tryptophan, as well as niacin. Nixtamalization corrects the niacin deficiency and is a common practice in Native American cultures that grow corn, but most especially in Mexico and the countries of Central America. Following the corn cycle, the symptoms usually appear during spring, increase in the summer due to greater sun exposure, and return the following spring. Pellagra was once common in the poorer states of the U.S. South, such as Mississippi and Alabama, where its cyclical appearance in the spring after meat-heavy winter diets led to it being known as "spring sickness" (particularly when it appeared among more vulnerable children), as well as among the residents of jails and orphanages as studied by Dr. Joseph Goldberger.

Pellagra is common in Africa, Indonesia, and China. In affluent societies, most patients with clinical pellagra are poor, homeless, alcohol-dependent, or psychiatric patients who refuse food. Pellagra was common among prisoners of Soviet labor camps (the Gulags). In addition, pellagra, as a micronutrient deficiency disease, frequently affects populations of refugees and other displaced people due to their unique, long-term residential circumstances and dependence on food aid. Refugees typically rely on limited sources of vitamin B_{3} provided to them, often peanuts (which, in Africa, may be supplied in place of local groundnut staples, such as the Bambara or Hausa groundnut); the instability in the nutritional content and distribution of food aid can be the cause of pellagra in displaced populations. In the 2000s, outbreaks occurred in countries such as Angola, Zimbabwe, and Nepal. In Angola specifically, recent reports show a similar incidence of pellagra since 2002, with clinical pellagra in 0.3% of women and 0.2% of children, and niacin deficiency in 29.4% of women and 6% of children related to high untreated corn consumption.

In other countries such as the Netherlands and Denmark, even with sufficient intake of niacin, cases have been reported. In this case, deficiency might happen not just because of poverty or malnutrition, but secondary to alcoholism, drug interaction (psychotropic, cytostatic, tuberculostatic, or analgesics), HIV, vitamin B_{2} and B_{6} deficiency, or malabsorption syndromes such as Hartnup disease and carcinoid tumors.

== History ==
Native American cultivators who first domesticated corn (maize) prepared it by nixtamalization, in which the grain is treated with a solution of alkali such as lime. Nixtamalization makes the niacin nutritionally available and prevents pellagra. When maize was cultivated worldwide, and eaten as a staple without nixtamalization, pellagra became common.

Pellagra was first described for its dermatological effect in Spain in 1735 by Gaspar Casal. He explained that the disease causes dermatitis in exposed skin areas such as hands, feet, and neck and that the origin of the disease is poor diet and atmospheric influences. His work published in 1762 by his friend Juan Sevillano was titled Historia Natural y Medicina del Principado de Asturias or Natural and Medical History of the Principality of Asturias (1762). This led to the disease being known as "Asturian leprosy", and it is recognized as the first modern pathological description of a syndrome. It was an endemic disease in northern Italy, where it was named, from Lombard, by Francesco Frapolli of Milan (see #Etymology). With pellagra affecting over 100,000 people in Italy by the 1880s, debates raged as to how to classify the disease (as a form of scurvy, elephantiasis, or as something new) and over its causation. In the 19th century, Roussel started a campaign in France to restrict consumption of maize and eradicated the disease in France, but it remained endemic in many rural areas of Europe. Because pellagra outbreaks occurred in regions where maize was a dominant food crop, the most convincing hypothesis during the late 19th century, as espoused by Cesare Lombroso, was that the maize either carried a toxic substance or was a carrier of disease. Louis Sambon, an Anglo-Italian doctor working at the London School of Tropical Medicine, was convinced that pellagra was carried by an insect, along the lines of malaria. Later, the lack of pellagra outbreaks in Mesoamerica, where maize is a major food crop, led researchers to investigate processing techniques in that region.

Pellagra was studied mostly in Europe until the late 19th century, when it became epidemic especially in the Southern United States. In the early 1900s, pellagra reached epidemic proportions in the American South. Between 1906 and 1940 more than 3 million Americans were affected by pellagra with more than 100,000 deaths, yet the epidemic resolved itself right after dietary niacin fortification. Pellagra deaths in South Carolina numbered 1,306 during the first 10 months of 1915; 100,000 Southerners were affected in 1916. At this time, the scientific community held that pellagra was probably caused by a germ or some unknown toxin in corn.

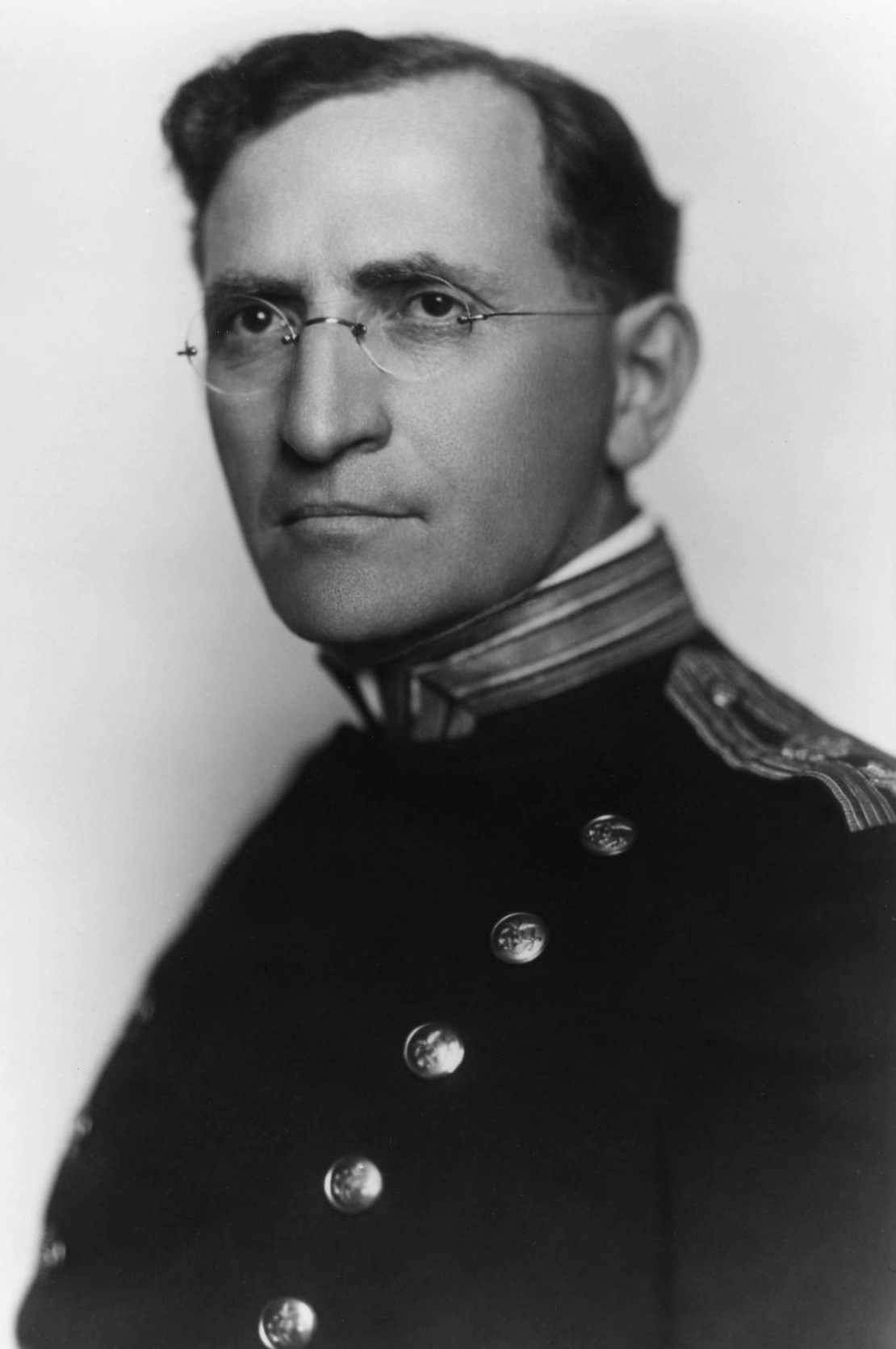
Dr. Joseph Goldberger

In parallel, a disease called zeism was described in 1912 in Rhodesia, due to the loss of some nutrient when grinding maize; by 1914, it seemed likely that the two conditions were synonymous, and hence that pellagra, too, was due to a nutrient deficiency.

The Spartanburg Pellagra Hospital in Spartanburg, South Carolina, was the first facility in the United States dedicated to discovering the cause of pellagra. It was established in 1914 with a special Congressional appropriation to the U.S. Public Health Service and set up primarily for research. In 1915, Dr. Joseph Goldberger, assigned to study pellagra by the surgeon general of the United States, showed it was linked to diet by observing the outbreaks of pellagra in orphanages and mental hospitals. Goldberger noted that children between the ages of 6 and 12 (but not older or younger children at the orphanages) and patients at the mental hospitals (but not doctors or nurses) were the ones who seemed most susceptible to pellagra. Goldberger theorized that a lack of meat, milk, eggs, and legumes made those particular populations susceptible to pellagra. By modifying the diet served in these institutions with "a marked increase in the fresh animal and the leguminous protein foods," Goldberger was able to show that pellagra could be prevented. By 1926, Goldberger established that a diet that included these foods, or a small amount of brewer's yeast, prevented pellagra.

Goldberger experimented on 11 prisoners (one was dismissed because of prostatitis). Before the experiment, the prisoners were eating the prison fare fed to all inmates at Rankin Prison Farm in Mississippi. Goldberger started feeding them a restricted diet of grits, syrup, mush, biscuits, cabbage, sweet potatoes, rice, collards, and coffee with sugar (no milk). Healthy white male volunteers were selected as the typical skin lesions were easier to see in Caucasians and this population was felt to be those least susceptible to the disease, thus provide the strongest evidence that the disease was caused by a nutritional deficiency. Subjects experienced mild, but typical cognitive and gastrointestinal symptoms, and within five months of this cereal-based diet, 6 of the 11 subjects broke out in the skin lesions that are necessary for a definitive diagnosis of pellagra. The lesions appeared first on the scrotum. Goldberger was not given the opportunity to experimentally reverse the effects of diet-induced pellagra, as the prisoners were released shortly after the diagnoses of pellagra were confirmed. In the 1920s, he connected pellagra to the corn-based diets of rural areas rather than infection as contemporary medical opinion would suggest. Goldberger believed that the root cause of pellagra amongst Southern farmers was limited diet resulting from poverty, and that social and land reform would cure epidemic pellagra. His reform efforts were not realized, but crop diversification in the Southern United States, and the accompanying improvement in diet, dramatically reduced the risk of pellagra. Goldberger is remembered as the "unsung hero of American clinical epidemiology". Though he identified that a missing nutritional element was responsible for pellagra, he did not discover the specific vitamin responsible.

In 1937, Conrad Elvehjem, a biochemistry professor at the University of Wisconsin-Madison, showed that the vitamin B_{3} cured pellagra (manifested as black tongue) in dogs. Later studies by Dr. Tom Spies, Marion Blankenhorn, and Clark Cooper established that niacin also cured pellagra in humans, for which Time dubbed them its 1938 Men of the Year in comprehensive science.

Research conducted between 1900 and 1950 found the number of cases of women with pellagra was consistently double the number of cases of affected men. This is thought to be due to the inhibitory effect of estrogen on the conversion of the amino acid tryptophan to nicotinic acid mononucleotide (NaMN). Some researchers of the time gave a few explanations regarding the difference.

Gillman and Gillman related skeletal tissue and pellagra in their research in South Africans. They provide some of the best evidence for skeletal manifestations of pellagra and the reaction of bone in malnutrition. They claimed radiological studies of adult pellagrins demonstrated marked osteoporosis. A negative mineral balance in pellagrins was noted, which indicated active mobilization and excretion of endogenous mineral substances, and undoubtedly impacted the turnover of bone. Extensive dental caries were present in over half of pellagra patients. In most cases, caries were associated with "severe gingival retraction, sepsis, exposure of cementum, and loosening of teeth".

=== United States ===
Corn grits, yellow unenriched, dry
Nutritional value per 100 g (3.5 oz)
- Protein: 8.8 g
- Tryptophan: 0.062 g
Vitamins and minerals
Vitamins	Quantity %DV^{†}
Niacin (B3)	8% 1.2 mg
- ^{†}Percentages estimated using US recommendations for adults.

Peanut, valencia, raw
Nutritional value per 100 g (3.5 oz)
- Protein: 25 g
- Tryptophan: 0.2445 g
Vitamins and minerals
Vitamins	Quantity %DV^{†}
Niacin (B3)	81% 12.9 mg
- ^{†}Percentages estimated using US recommendations for adults.

Pellagra was first reported in 1902 in the United States, and has "caused more deaths than any other nutrition-related disease in American history", reaching epidemic proportions in the American South during the early 1900s. Poverty and consumption of corn were the most frequently observed risk factors, but the exact cause was not known, until groundbreaking work by Joseph Goldberger. A 2017 National Bureau of Economic Research paper explored the role of cotton production in the emergence of disease; one prominent theory is that "widespread cotton production had displaced local production of niacin-rich foods and driven poor Southern farmers and mill workers to consume milled Midwestern corn, which was relatively cheap but also devoid of the niacin necessary to prevent pellagra." The study provided evidence in favor of the theory: there were lower pellagra rates in areas where farmers had been forced to abandon cotton production (a highly profitable crop) in favor of food crops (less profitable crops) due to boll weevil infestation of cotton crops (which occurred randomly).

Pellagra developed especially among the vulnerable populations in institutions such as orphanages and prisons, because of the monotonous and restricted diet. Soon pellagra began to occur in epidemic proportions in states south of the Potomac and Ohio rivers. The pellagra epidemic lasted for nearly four decades beginning in 1906. It was estimated that there were 3 million cases, and 100,000 deaths due to pellagra during the epidemic.

The pellagra epidemic in the American south had subsided in periods of low cotton production (late 1910s to early 1920s, the Great Depression), but it had consistently rebounded as cotton production recovered. The cause would not be understood until 1937, when the relation with niacin was discovered. Voluntary food fortification and periods of mandatory fortification on the state and federal levels soon followed, coinciding with a continuous drop in pellagra deaths. By the 1950s, the disease was virtually eliminated from the US.

==== Corn processing ====
The whole dried corn kernel contains a nutritious germ and a thin seed coat that provides some fiber. There are two important considerations for using ground whole-grain corn.

1. The germ contains oil that is exposed by grinding, thus whole-grain cornmeal and grits turn rancid quickly at room temperature and should be refrigerated.
2. Whole-grain cornmeal and grits require extended cooking times as seen in the following cooking directions for whole-grain grits:
  "Place the grits in a pan and cover them with water. Allow the grits to settle a full minute, tilt the pan, and skim off and discard the chaff and hulls with a fine tea strainer. Cook the grits for 50 minutes if the grits were soaked overnight or else 90 minutes if not."

The milling of corn removes the aleurone and germ layers, removing much of the (already low) amounts of bioavailable niacin and tryptophan found within. (Note: Using corn as the sole source of food carries a risk of pellagra and other nutritional deficiencies, because directly ground, untreated corn contains neither sufficient niacin nor enough digestible tryptophan. The Mesoamerican civilizations developed nixtamalization, which entails pre-processing corn by soaking in an alkaline solution. Doing so prevents pellagra by increasing the digestibility of tryptophan-containing proteins. They furthermore combined corn with legumes to form a complete protein. (Several sources repeat a claim that corn contains "niacytin", niacin bound up in a complex with hemicellulose which is nutritionally unavailable. They claim that niacytin is up to 90% of the total niacin content in grain, and that nixtamalization prevents pellagra by librating this niacin. However, a long line of evidence shows that nixtamalization has no effect on the niacin content of corn.)) The milling and degerming of corn in the preparation of cornmeal became feasible with the development of the Beall degerminator, which was originally patented in 1901 and was used to separate the grit from the germ in corn processing. Casimir Funk, who helped elucidate the role of thiamin in the etiology of beriberi, was an early investigator of the problem of pellagra. Funk suggested that a change in the method of milling corn was responsible for the outbreak of pellagra, but no attention was paid to his article on this subject.

== In popular culture ==
- George Sessions Perry's 1941 novel Hold Autumn in Your Hand – and Jean Renoir's 1945 film adaptation of it, The Southerner – incorporates pellagra ("spring sickness") as a major plot element in the story of an impoverished Texas farm family.
- Satirical singer/pianist Tom Lehrer referred to pellagra as an endemic disease of the Southern states in the lyrics of his 1960 song "I Wanna Go Back to Dixie" -- "I'll go back to the Swanee / Where pellagra makes ya scrawny / And the honeysuckle clutters up the vine."
- Season 2, Episode 22 of House, titled "Forever", focuses on a new mother diagnosed with pellagra who experiences aggression and homicidal tendencies
