= SLC6A19 =

Protein-coding gene in the species Homo sapiens

An Error has occurred retrieving Wikidata item for infobox Sodium-dependent neutral amino acid transporter B(0)AT1 is a protein that in humans is encoded by the SLC6A19 gene.

== Function ==
SLC6A19 is a system B(0) transporter that mediates epithelial resorption of neutral amino acids across the apical membrane in the kidney and intestine.

== Clinical significance ==
Mutations in the SLC6A19 gene cause Hartnup disease.
