= Giraltovce =

- Municipality
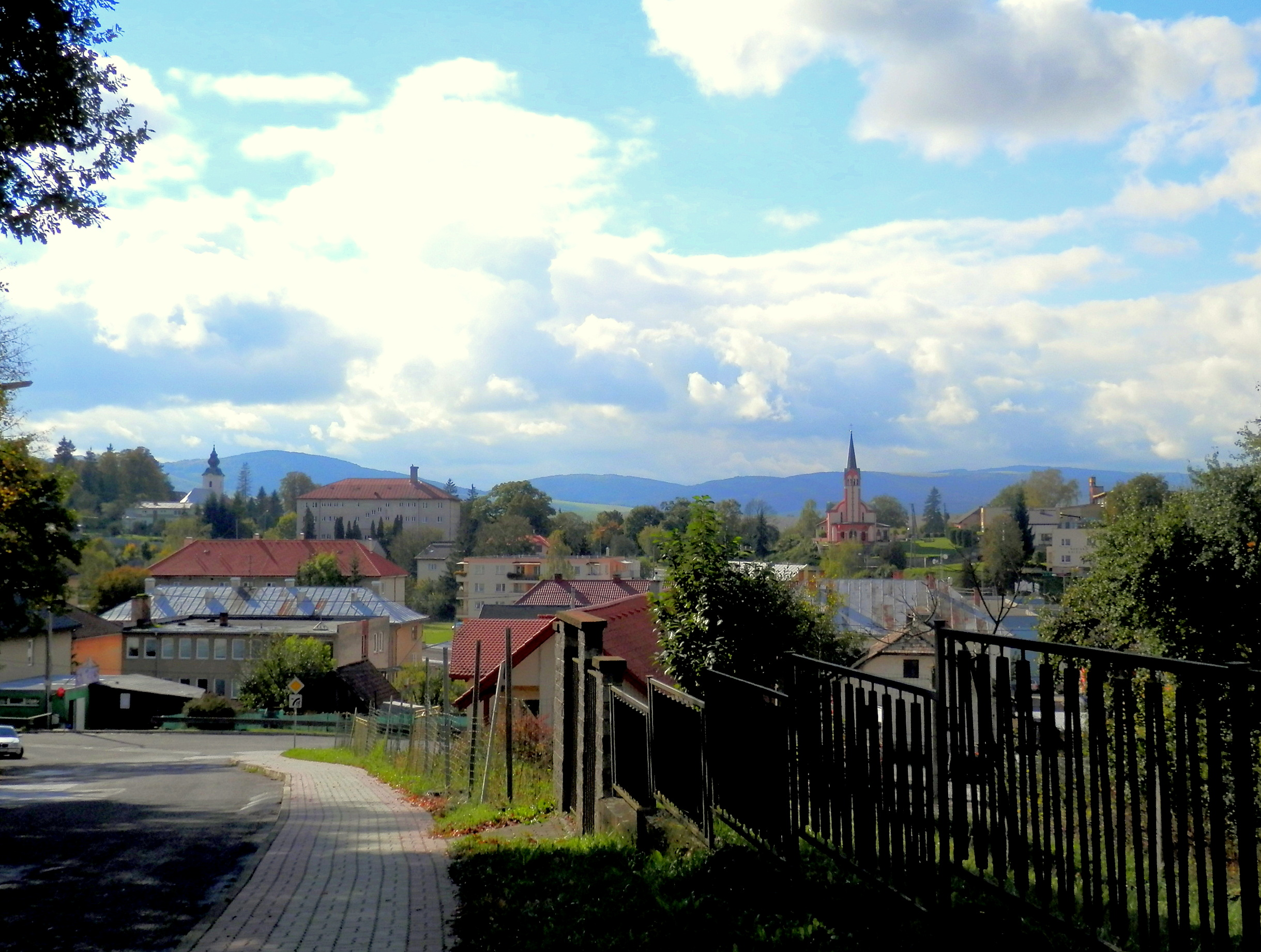

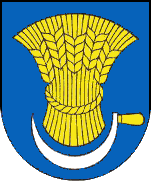
- Flag Coat of arms

- Location of Giraltovce in the Prešov Region Location of Giraltovce in Slovakia
- Coordinates: 49.11°N 21.52°E
- Country: Slovakia
- Region: Prešov Region
- District: Svidník District
- First mentioned: 1427

Area
  - Total: 11.04 km^{2} (4.26 sq mi)
- (2022)
- Elevation: 207 m (679 ft)

Population (2025)
  - Total: 3,920

Population by ethnicity (2011)
  - Slovak: 77.9%
  - Roma: 2.4%
  - Ukrainian: 0.2%
  - Czech: 0.2%
  - Other: 0.1%
  - Unreported: 18.7%

Population by religion (2011)
  - Roman Catholic: 46.8%
  - Lutheran: 20.3%
  - Greek Catholic: 6.6%
  - Orthodox: 1%
  - Jehovah's Witness: 0.9%
  - Others: 1.4%
  - Non-religious: 2.1%
  - Unreported: 20.1%
- Time zone: UTC+1 (CET)
  - Summer (DST): UTC+2 (CEST)
- Postal code: 870 1
- Area code: +421 54
- Vehicle registration plate (until 2022): SK
- Website: www.giraltovce.sk

Giraltovce (Hungarian: Girált, Rusyn: Ґіралтівцї) is a town in the Prešov Region of eastern Slovakia.

== Geography ==
The municipality lies at an altitude of 207 metres (679 ft) and covers an area of 11.04 km^{2} (4.26 sq mi) (2025).

== History ==
The town was first mentioned in 1383 as Giralth. It was named after a man called Geralth who was first hereditary scultetus (a locator serving a noble in founding a new village). The town was founded in the 13th century. In 1427 it was the property of the Széchy family, a few years later it belonged to the Somosy family. The scultetus had a leading role in the village. They acted as the representative of the village before the landlords, regional and religious authorities. They controlled villagers to pay their taxes. Moreover, they had also right of minor magistracy. Their rights were more restricted by changes in the 16th century. In the 17th century, the institution of hereditary scultetus in the village expired. Since that moment, local villagers voted their Chief Magistrate ("Richter").

The most privileged part of inhabitants of the village was nobility, who built at least two mansions there. Moreover, János Semsey conducted to build in the village the temple of the Lutheran church (1650 - 1654), which was the first temple built in the village.

Before the establishment of independent Czechoslovakia in 1918, Giraltovce was part of Sáros County within the Kingdom of Hungary. From 1939 to 1945, it was part of the Slovak Republic. On 18 January 1945, the 1st Czechoslovak Army Corps and the Red Army dislodged the Wehrmacht from Giraltovce in the course of the Western Carpathian offensive and it was once again part of Czechoslovakia.

== Population ==
Population statistic (10 years)
| Year | 1995 | 2005 | 2015 | 2025 |
|---|---|---|---|---|
| Count | 4271 | 4182 | 4146 | 3920 |
| Difference | | −2.08% | −0.86% | −5.45% |

Population statistic
| Year | 2024 | 2025 |
|---|---|---|
| Count | 3958 | 3920 |
| Difference | | −0.96% |

It has a population of 3920 people (31 December 2025).

=== Ethnicity ===
Census 2021 (1+ %)
| Ethnicity | Number | Fraction |
|---|---|---|
| Slovak | 3504 | 87.57% |
| Not found out | 432 | 10.79% |
| Romani | 366 | 9.14% |
| Rusyn | 58 | 1.44% |
| Total | 4001 | |

In year 2021 was 4001 people by ethnicity 3504 as Slovak, 432 as Not found out, 366 as Romani, 58 as Rusyn, 10 as Czech, 6 as Hungarian, 5 as Ukrainian, 5 as Italian, 4 as Other, 3 as Russian, 3 as Albanian, 2 as Croatian, 1 as Polish, 1 as Greek and 1 as English.

Note on population: The difference values of population numbers in the table "Population statistic" and in the sections "Ethnicity" & "Religion" is caused by the use of various statistical methods.

=== Religion ===
Census 2021 (1+ %)
| Religion | Number | Fraction |
|---|---|---|
| Roman Catholic Church | 2075 | 51.86% |
| Evangelical Church | 777 | 19.42% |
| Not found out | 409 | 10.22% |
| None | 294 | 7.35% |
| Greek Catholic Church | 278 | 6.95% |
| Total | 4001 | |

In year 2021 was 4001 people by religion 2075 from Roman Catholic Church, 777 from Evangelical Church, 409 from Not found out, 294 from None, 278 from Greek Catholic Church, 37 from Eastern Orthodox Church, 36 from Jehovah's Witnesses, 32 from Christian Congregations in Slovakia, 19 from Church of the Brethren, 12 from Paganism and natural spirituality, 7 from Ad hoc movements, 6 from Other, 6 from Apostolic Church, 3 from Old Catholic Church, 3 from Other and not ascertained christian church, 2 from Islam, 2 from United Methodist Church, 1 from Jewish community, 1 from Buddhism and 1 from Baptists Church.

== Notable citizens ==
- Joseph Goldberger

== Twin towns – sister cities ==
Giraltovce is twinned with:

- Ustrzyki Dolne, Poland

== See also ==
- List of municipalities and towns in Slovakia

== Genealogical resources ==
The records for genealogical research are available at the state archive "Statny Archiv in Presov, Slovakia"

- Roman Catholic church records (births/marriages/deaths): 1840-1902 (parish B)
- Greek Catholic church records (births/marriages/deaths): 1862-1933 (parish B)
- Lutheran church records (births/marriages/deaths): 1828-1898 (parish A)
