= James S. McLester =

American physician and nutritionist

James Somerville McLester
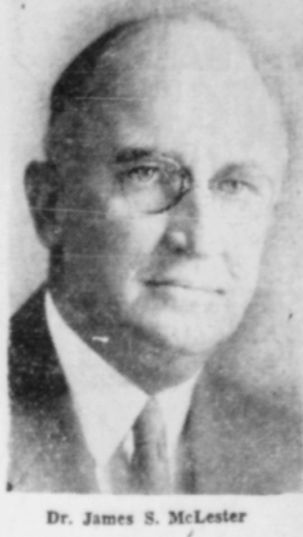
- Born: January 25, 1877; Tuscaloosa, Alabama
- Died: February 8, 1954 (aged 77); Birmingham, Alabama
- Occupations: Physician, nutritionist

James Somerville McLester (January 25, 1877 – February 8, 1954) was an American physician, nutritionist and writer.

McLester was born at Tuscaloosa, Alabama. He was educated at the University of Alabama and graduated M.D. from the University of Virginia in 1899. McLester studied medicine at Göttingen, Freiburg, Berlin and Munich. In 1902, he was appointed professor of pathology at Birmingham Medical College. He became professor of medicine, a post he held until 1912. He was appointed professor of medicine at the University of Alabama School of Medicine. He became professor emeritus in 1949.

During World War I, McLester was commissioned as First Lieutenant in the Medical Reserve Corps. He was promoted in 1918 to Lieutenant Colonel and Colonel in 1919. McLester received a LL.D. degree from the University of Alabama in 1929. McLester was president of the Alabama Medical Association in 1920. He was Chairman of the Council on Food and Nutrition of the American Medical Association and was president in 1935.

He married Ada Bowron in 1903, they had four children. McLester was described as "one of the nation's outstanding nutritionists". In 1953, he was awarded the Joseph Goldberger Gold Medal for outstanding work in clinical nutrition by trustees of the American Medical Association. McLester died from coronary thrombosis in Birmingham, Alabama.

A portrait of McLester was unveiled in January, 2018 in the main lobby of the UAB Community Health Services Building at the University of Alabama at Birmingham.

== Selected publications ==
- The Diagnosis and Treatment of Disorder of Metabolism (1928)
- Nutrition and Diet in Health and Disease (1931, 1949)
