= N1-Methyl-4-pyridone-3-carboxamide =

N^{1}-Methyl-4-pyridone-3-carboxamide

Names
- IUPAC name 1-Methyl-4-oxopyridine-3-carboxamide
- Other names 4PY

Identifiers
CAS Number	769-49-3
3D model (JSmol)	Interactive image
ChEBI	CHEBI:27838
ChEMBL	ChEMBL3542326
ChemSpider	389671
EC Number	845-640-9
KEGG	C05843
PubChem CID	440810
UNII	VE4S15CI8D
CompTox Dashboard (EPA)	DTXSID80227697
- InChI: InChI=1S/C7H8N2O2/c1-9-3-2-6(10)5(4-9)7(8)11/h2-4H,1H3,(H2,8,11) Key: KTLRWTOPTKGYQY-UHFFFAOYSA-N
- SMILES: CN1C=CC(=O)C(=C1)C(=O)N

Properties
Chemical formula	C_{7}H_{8}N_{2}O_{2}
Molar mass	152.153 g·mol^{−1}

Hazards
- GHS labelling
Pictograms	(GHS07: Exclamation mark)
Signal word	Warning
Hazard statements	H302, H315, H319, H335
Precautionary statements	P261, P264, P264+P265, P270, P271, P280, P301+P317, P302+P352, P304+P340, P305+P351+P338, P319, P321, P330, P332+P317, P337+P317, P362+P364, P403+P233, P405, P501
- Except where otherwise noted, data are given for materials in their standard state (at 25 °C [77 °F], 100 kPa). Infobox references

N^{1}-Methyl-4-pyridone-3-carboxamide, also abbreviated as 4PY, is a breakdown product of niacin and NAD, that is associated with an increased risk of cardiovascular disease. It has 2 carbonyl groups that are close to each other.
