= N1-Methyl-2-pyridone-5-carboxamide =

Names
- Preferred IUPAC name 1-Methyl-6-oxo-1,6-dihydropyridine-3-carboxamide
- Other names Nudifloramide; 6-Keto-1-methyl-nicotinamide

Identifiers
CAS Number	701-44-0
3D model (JSmol)	Interactive image
ChEBI	CHEBI:27410
ChEMBL	ChEMBL3542314
ChemSpider	62899
KEGG	C05842
PubChem CID	69698
UNII	68139USC7W
CompTox Dashboard (EPA)	DTXSID70220374
- InChI: InChI=1S/C7H8N2O2/c1-9-4-5(7(8)11)2-3-6(9)10/h2-4H,1H3,(H2,8,11) Key: JLQSXXWTCJPCBC-UHFFFAOYSA-N
- SMILES: CN1C=C(C=CC1=O)C(=O)N

Properties
Chemical formula	C_{7}H_{8}N_{2}O_{2}
Molar mass	152.153 g·mol^{−1}
- Except where otherwise noted, data are given for materials in their standard state (at 25 °C [77 °F], 100 kPa). Infobox references

N1-Methyl-2-pyridone-5-carboxamide (also known as 1-methyl-6-oxopyridine-3-carboxamide or nudifloramide and abbreviated as 2PY, 2-Py or NMPC) is one of a number of metabolic products of nicotinamide adenine dinucleotide (NAD) degradation. The presence of 2PY in human blood serum can be an indication of poor kidney performance or chronic kidney disease. 2PY has been identified as a product of the metabolism of caffeine and niacin.

2PY's molecular formula is C_{7}H_{8}N_{2}O_{2} and its molecular weight 152.153 g/mol.
