= Tom Douglas Spies =

Dr. Tom Douglas Spies (September 21, 1902 in Ravenna, Texas – February 28, 1960 in New York City) was a distinguished American physician and medical educator. He was an authority in the study of nutritional diseases. In the 1930s, he contributed significantly to finding a cure for pellagra, a nutritional disease that once afflicted millions in the American South. Later, he also made a large contribution to finding cure for tropical sprue. For his efforts in elimination of pellagra, Time Magazine named him as 1938 "Man of the Year" in comprehensive science.

== Education ==
A member of Phi Beta Kappa, Spies received a B.A. degree from the University of Texas in 1923 and an M.D. from Harvard in 1927. He spent the next two years in pathology in Boston hospitals and then went to Western Reserve University to become an instructor in medicine until 1935.

== Work ==
Spies became assistant professor of medicine at the University of Cincinnati's College of Medicine (1935–1947). After 1947, he became an instructor at Northwestern University Medical School.

=== Nutrition clinic ===
Spies was best known as a director of Nutrition Clinic at the Hillman Hospital, Birmingham, Alabama, after 1936.

He was invited to come to Birmingham in 1935 by James S. McLester, physician-in-chief of the Hillman Hospital, who was then also the President of the American Medical Association.

In 1945, he and six social workers, including Martha Hutchinson, studied the effects of daily supplementation of milk on the growth and development of malnourished children.

=== Other contributions ===
Spies was appointed to the Food and Nutrition Board of National Research Council in 1943, and was a consultant on tropical medicine at Washington's Army Medical School, 1945.

He labored with unremitting zeal to put thiamine, nicotinic acid, riboflavin, folic acid, vitamin B12 and thymine (5-methyl uracil) to use in clinical and preventive medicine.

In the late 1940s, Spies experimented with the use of folic acid and other vitamins in the treatment of tropical sprue, which was a deadly disease at that time; he conducted his research in Cuba and Puerto Rico. He received recognition from the Cuban and Puerto Rican governments for his efforts.

According to the American Medical Association,

Through his researches, pellagra in the southern United States and tropical sprue in Cuba and Puerto Rico have been virtually eliminated. Perhaps his greatest contribution has been his study of the dietary requirements for the preservation of tissue integrity, whereby premature aging can be prevented.

== Honors and awards ==
- John Phillips Memorial Award of American College of Physicians;
- Southern Medical Association Research Medal;
- D.Sc., University of the South;
- Charles V. Chapin Award (Rhode Island);
- Modern Medicine Award for distinguished achievement;
- Oscar B. Hunter Award of the American Therapeutic Society;
- Recognition by U. S. Congress and Puerto Rico Congress;
- Seven decorations and awards from the Government of Cuba;
- American Medical Association Distinguished Service Award (1957).

== Bibliography ==
- Tom Douglas Spies, Nutrition and disease : special issue from the Department of Nutrition and Metabolism, Northwestern University Medical School, Chicago, Illinois; Nutrition Clinic, Hillman Hospital, Birmingham, Alabama. Minneapolis : McGraw-Hill, 1955
- Spies, Tom Douglas, Rehabilitation through better nutrition. Philadelphia, Saunders, 1947
- Tom Douglas Spies, Vitamins and vitamin deficiencies. Vitamin B12.. N.Y. 1949.
- FROSTIG, J. P., and SPIES, T. D.: The initial syndrome of pellagra and associated deficiency diseases. American Journal of the Medical Sciences 199:268, 1940.
- ARING, C. D., EVANS, J. P., and SPIES, T. D.: Some Clinical Neurologic Aspects of Vitamin B Deficiencies. Journal of the American Medical Association 113:2105, 1939.
- ARING, C. D., and SPIES, T. D.: A Critical Review: Vitamin B Deficiency and Nervous Disease. Journal of Neurological Psychiatry 2:335, 1939.
