= Conrad Elvehjem =

American biochemist (1901–1962)

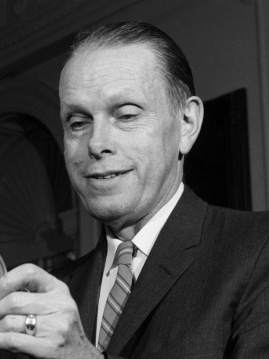
- Elvehjem in 1961
- Born: May 27, 1901; McFarland, Wisconsin, U.S.
- Died: July 27, 1962 (aged 61); Madison, Wisconsin, U.S.
- Education: University of Wisconsin (PhD)
- Known for: Nutrition niacin
- Spouse: Constance W. Elvehjem
- Awards: Willard Gibbs Award (1943); Lasker-DeBakey Clinical Medical Research Award (1952)
- Scientific career
- Fields: Biochemistry

Conrad Arnold Elvehjem (May 27, 1901 – July 27, 1962) was internationally known as an American biochemist in nutrition and a university president. In 1937 he identified two vitamins, nicotinic acid, also known as niacin, and nicotinamide, which were deficient directly in human pellagra, once a major health problem in the United States. Collectively, nicotinic acid and nicotinamide are termed vitamin B_{3} and are now understood to be precursors of nicotinamide adenine dinucleotide. He was also president of the University of Wisconsin.

== Biography ==
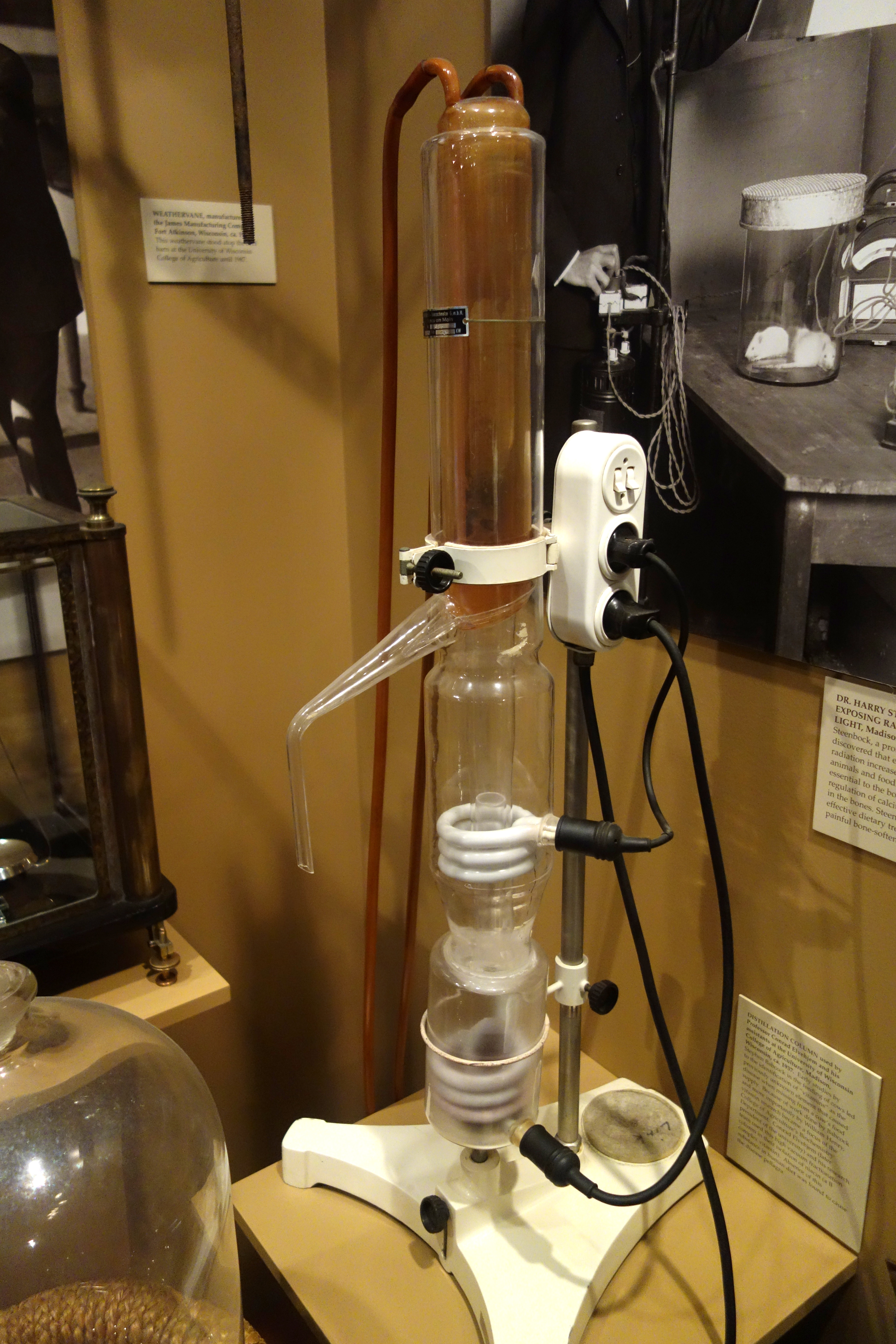
Distillation column used to isolate niacin by Prof. Conrad Elvehjem, c. 1937

Conrad Elvehjem, the son of Norwegian emigrants to Wisconsin, was born in McFarland, Wisconsin. He progressed through the secondary schools and the University of Wisconsin, where he received his PhD in 1927 with mentor E.B. Hart for his studies of the importance of copper in iron-deficiency anemia. A National Research Council fellowship permitted a year at Cambridge University in England. Elvehjem began teaching in agricultural chemistry at the University of Wisconsin in 1923, and became a full professor in 1936. He became chairman of the biochemistry department in 1944 and dean of the graduate school in 1946, at 45 years of age. He served as dean of the graduate school until he became the university's 13th president in 1958.

Picking up on the work of Joseph Goldberger, he found that nicotinic acid cured black tongue in dogs, an analogous disease to pellagra. In the previous year, Elvehjem and his colleague Carl J. Koehn had found that a filtrate factor from a liver extract could cure diet-induced pellagra in chicks. That filtrate extract was designated as the vitamin G fraction, after the late Goldberger. To confirm their findings in dogs, they induced black tongue in these animals with the Goldberger diet of yellow corn, before supplementing the diet with the vitamin G fraction. Elvehjem and his colleagues later were able to isolate and identify nicotinamide and nicotinic acid from vitamin G as the curative factors for black tongue in dogs. He also contributed greatly to the identification of vitamin B complex and was co-author of more than 780 scientific papers on biochemistry and nutrition.

Elvehjem commented frequently on nutrition as it affects both scientist and layman. "Vitamins should be obtained from natural foods if possible", he cautioned. "Generally they are cheaper, more palatable, and in better balance with other factors when taken in this form." He acknowledged the value of synthetic vitamins in treating deficiency diseases, but warned that their use should be temporary.

Elvehjem's first graduate student (in 1931) was noted nutritionist Fredrick John Stare (1910–2002) who later founded and chaired the department of nutrition at the Harvard School of Public Health, where he served until 1976.

Elvehjem met his wife Constance W. Elvehjem when she was an undergraduate at UW Madison. She died in 1999 at the age of 94 after many years supporting the museum and the Madison community. Elvehjem was stricken with a heart attack at his desk on the morning of July 27, 1962, at the age of sixty-one and died within the hour.

== Awards and honors ==
- United States National Academy of Sciences, member – 1942
- Willard Gibbs Medal – 1943
- American Philosophical Society, member – 1947
- Albert Lasker Award for clinical medical research – 1952
- American Academy of Arts and Sciences, member – 1953

== Legacy ==
Elvehjem's name appears on university awards, buildings, a town park, and a local elementary school in Madison, Wisconsin, and a neighbourhood on the South-East Side of Madison nearby and its associated neighbourhood association. His name was formerly on the Elvehjem Art Center (later the Elvehjem Museum of Art), until the museum received a $20 million donation from Simona and Jerome A. Chazen (both UW–Madison alumni), and renamed itself the Chazen Museum of Art. The original building housing the museum retains the Elvehjem name.

== Other sources ==
- Simoni RD, Hill RL, Vaughan M (August 2002). "Copper as an essential nutrient and nicotinic acid as the anti-black tongue (pellagra) factor: the work of Conrad Arnold Elvehjem". The Journal of Biological Chemistry. 277 (34): e22. doi:10.1016/S0021-9258(20)70109-2. ISSN 0021-9258. PMID 12185207.
- Elvehjem CA, Madden RJ, Strong FM, Woolley DW (February 1974). "The isolation and identification of the anti-black tongue factor". Nutrition Reviews. 32 (2): 48–50. doi:10.1111/j.1753-4887.1974.tb06263.x. ISSN 0029-6643. PMID 4274128. S2CID 7197859.
- Harper AE, Elvehjem CA (August 1991). "Journal of the American Medical Association, Volume 158, 1955: Importance of amino acid balance in nutrition". Nutrition Reviews. 49 (8): 233–4. doi:10.1111/j.1753-4887.1991.tb03034.x. ISSN 0029-6643. PMID 1956589.
- Burris RH, Baumann CA, Potter VR (1990). "Conrad Arnold Elvehjem: May 27, 1901 – July 27, 1962". Biographical Memoirs of the National Academy of Sciences. 59: 135–67. PMID 11616156.
- Todd W, Elvehjem C, Hart E (April 1980). "Zinc in the Nutrition of the Rat". Nutrition Reviews. 38 (4): 151–4. doi:10.1111/j.1753-4887.1980.tb05879.x. ISSN 0029-6643. PMID 7010227.
- Kline OL, Baumann CA (May 1971). "Conrad Arnold Elvehjem--a biographical sketch (1901–1962)". The Journal of Nutrition. 101 (5): 571–7. doi:10.1093/jn/101.5.569. ISSN 0022-3166. PMID 4930952.

Academic offices
Preceded by Edwin Broun Fred	President of the University of Wisconsin; 1958–1962	Succeeded by Fred Harvey Harrington
