= Inositol nicotinate =

Chemical compound

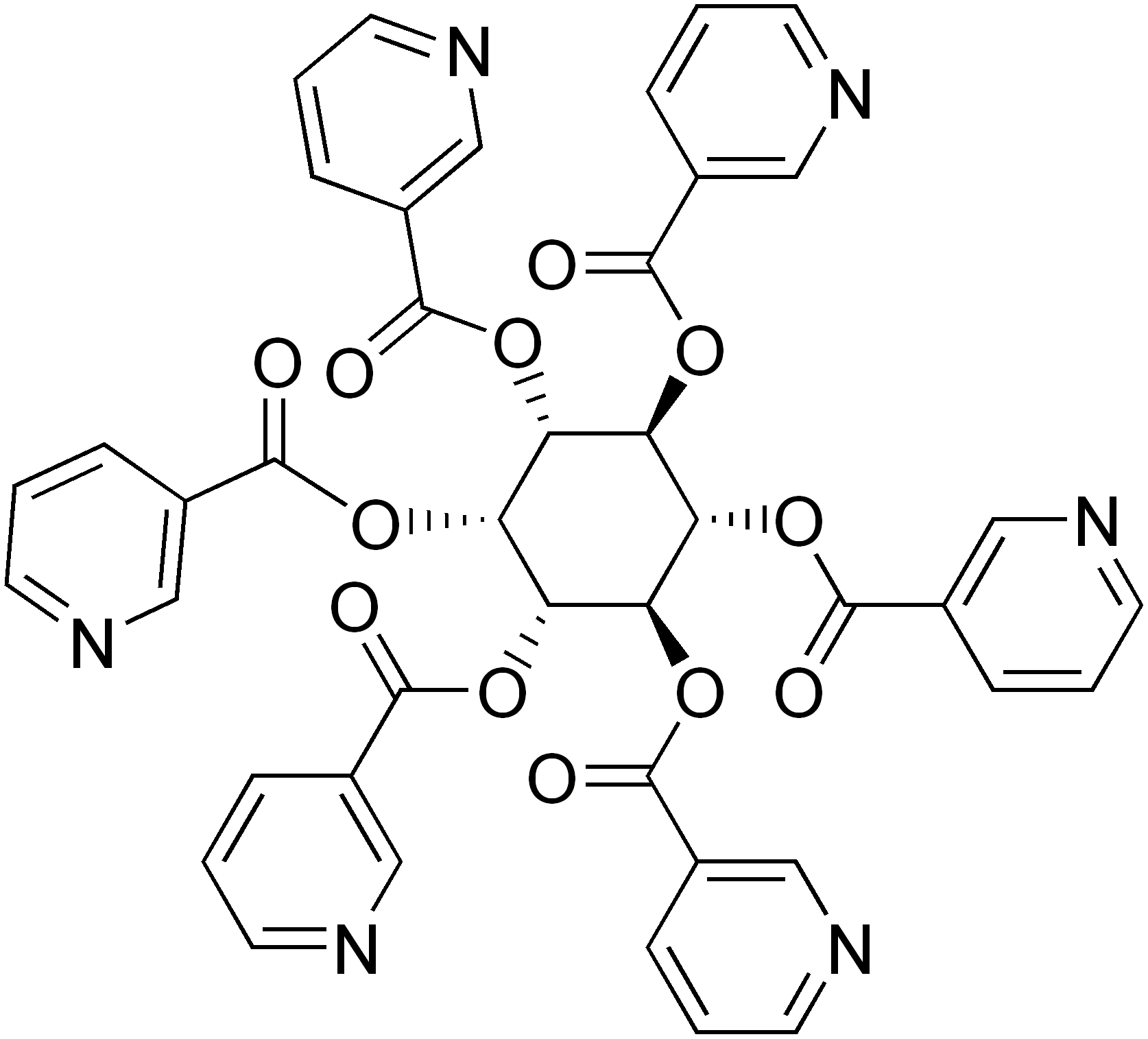

Clinical data
- Trade names: Hexopal
- AHFS/Drugs.com: International Drug Names
- Routes of administration: oral
- ATC code: C04AC03 (WHO)

Legal status
- Legal status: US: OTC

Identifiers
- IUPAC name: cyclohexane-1,2,3,4,5,6-hexayl hexanicotinate
- CAS Number: 6556-11-2
- PubChem CID: 3720
- ChemSpider: 16736141
- UNII: A99MK953KZ
- KEGG: D01813
- CompTox Dashboard (EPA): DTXSID2023147
- ECHA InfoCard: 100.026.806

Chemical and physical data
- Formula: C_{42}H_{30}N_{6}O_{12}
- Molar mass: 810.732 g·mol^{−1}
- 3D model (JSmol): Interactive image
- Melting point: 255 °C (491 °F)
- SMILES: O=C(O[C@H]6[C@H](OC(=O)c1cccnc1)[C@H](OC(=O)c2cccnc2)[C@H](OC(=O)c3cccnc3)[C@@H](OC(=O)c4cccnc4)[C@@H]6OC(=O)c5cccnc5)c7cccnc7

Inositol nicotinate, also known as inositol hexanicotinate or inositol hexaniacinate, is a compound of niacin (vitamin B3) and inositol. It is marketed in the United States as a "no-flush" form of niacin in dietary supplements.

== Mechanism of action ==
When ingested, inositol nicotinate breaks down into inositol and niacin. The niacin component helps widen blood vessels (vasodilation), lowers blood lipid levels (including cholesterol), and inhibits a protein involved in blood clotting.

== Uses ==
Inositol nicotinate is used to treat blood circulation problems, including:

- Raynaud's phenomenon
- Intermittent claudication

Some research shows it can improve symptoms of Raynaud's phenomenon over several weeks. However, its effectiveness in treating other conditions like:

- High cholesterol
- High blood pressure
- Leg pain during exercise (due to poor circulation)

remains unclear, with studies producing mixed results.

Other proposed uses, such as for:

- Migraines
- Psoriasis
- Restless legs syndrome

have insufficient supporting evidence.

== Side effects ==
Inositol nicotinate is generally safe when taken by mouth, but possible side effects include:

- Stomach upset
- Intestinal gas
- Nausea
- Liver damage (similar to other niacin products)

It is marketed as "no-flush" niacin, but research suggests that the lack of flushing may be due to its limited conversion to active niacin.

== Precautions ==
Inositol nicotinate should be used with caution in individuals with certain conditions:

- Diabetes: May raise blood sugar levels. Diabetic patients should monitor their blood sugar levels closely.
- Liver disease or kidney disease: Niacin can accumulate in people with liver or kidney problems, potentially worsening their condition.
- Bleeding disorders: Inositol nicotinate may slow blood clotting, increasing the risk of bleeding for individuals with clotting disorders or those undergoing surgery.
- Gout: Large amounts of niacin may trigger gout attacks.
