= Joseph Goldberger =

American epidemiologist

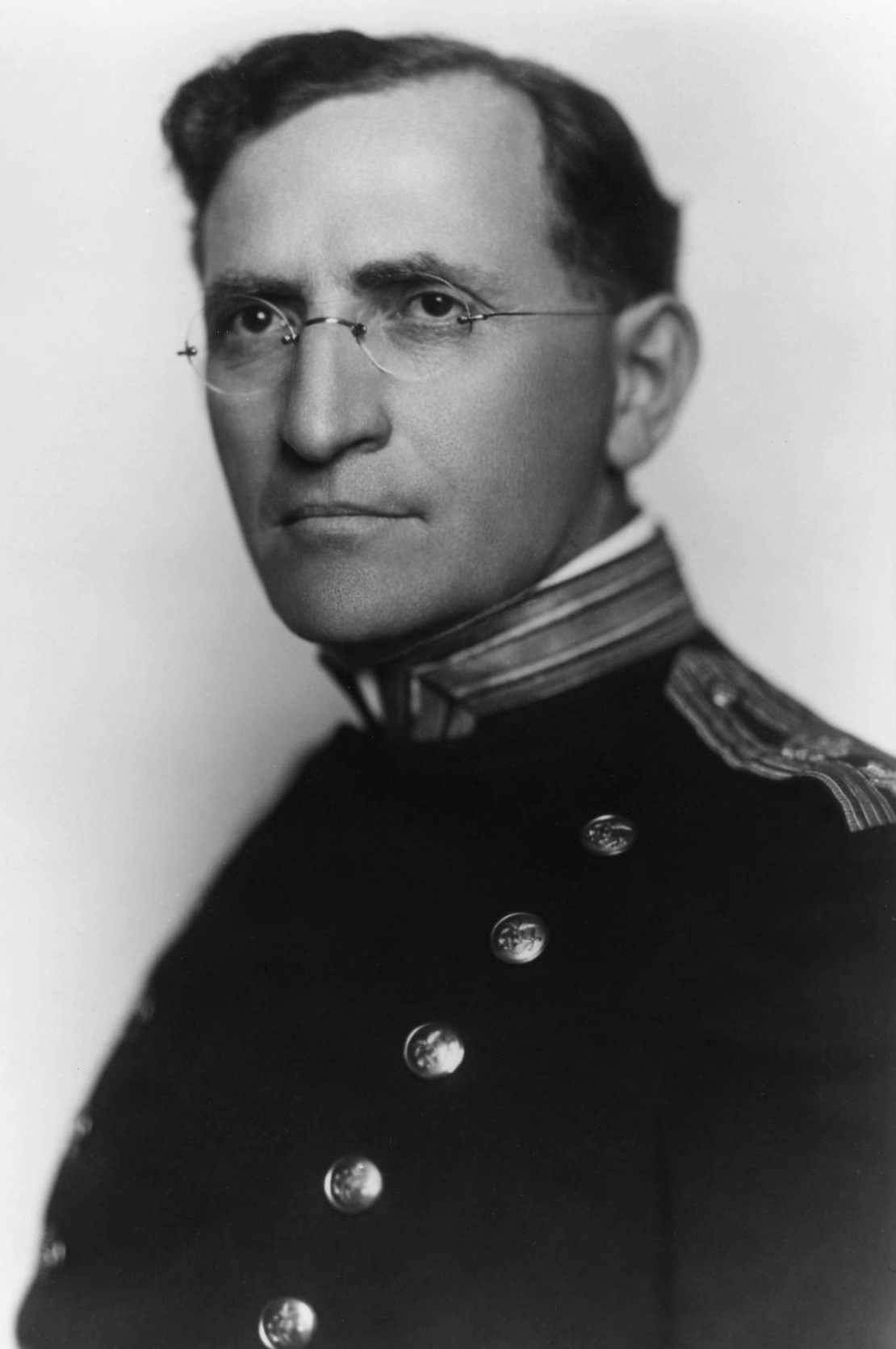
- Born: July 16, 1874; Girált, Kingdom of Hungary (now Giraltovce, Slovakia)
- Died: January 17, 1929 (aged 54); Washington, D.C., U.S.
- Spouse: Mary Goldberger
- Scientific career
- Fields: Epidemiology
- Workplaces: United States Public Health Service

Joseph Goldberger (Slovak: Jozef Goldberger, Hungarian: Goldberger József) (July 16, 1874 – January 17, 1929) was an American physician and epidemiologist in the United States Public Health Service (PHS). As a public health official, he was an advocate for scientific and social recognition of the links between poverty and disease. His early work with arriving immigrants at Ellis Island made him a standout investigator for detecting infectious diseases and he became a well-known epidemiologist.

Goldberger was nominated four times for the Nobel Prize for his important work on the link between pellagra and poor diet.

== Early life ==
Goldberger was born in Girált, Sáros County, Kingdom of Hungary (now Giraltovce, Slovakia), into a Jewish family. The youngest of six children, he immigrated to the U.S. with his parents in 1883, eventually settling in Manhattan's Lower East Side.

== Education ==
After completing his secondary education, Goldberger entered the City College of New York intending to pursue an engineering career. A chance encounter in 1892 led Goldberger to become interested in medicine and he transferred to the Bellevue Hospital Medical College (now the New York University School of Medicine), receiving his M.D. degree in 1895.

== Professional career ==
Setting up a private medical practice in Wilkes-Barre, Pennsylvania, Goldberger soon became intellectually restless. He joined the U.S. Marine Hospital Service (later known as the U.S. Public Health Service or PHS) in 1899, serving first post at the Port of New York, where he conducted health inspections of newly arrived immigrants.

From 1902–1906, Goldberger held a number of PHS epidemiology posts—in Mexico, Puerto Rico, Mississippi and Louisiana. He was involved in PHS efforts to combat yellow fever, typhus, dengue fever, and typhoid fever. He gave a particularly noted lecture in Boston, Massachusetts on the effects of parasites in disease transmission. In 1909, Goldberger published his research on an acarine mite-based parasitic infection common among poor, inner-city populations. He also worked with John F. Anderson investigating the transmission of measles and typhus.

=== Pellagra studies ===
In 1914, Goldberger was asked by US Surgeon General Rupert Blue to investigate pellagra, then an endemic disease in the Southern US. Previously it had been rather rare in the United States, but an epidemic broke out in 1906, primarily in the South, and continued until the 1940s. By 1912, South Carolina alone had 30,000 cases, and with a death rate of 40%, pellagra had devastating effects on the region.

Pellagra was a painful skin disease commonly found in tropical regions. Some physicians at the time believed that the disease arose in consequence of bad genes, airborne germs, or miasma resulting from poor sanitary conditions. Goldberger's theory that pellagra was associated with diet contradicted the most widely accepted medical opinion that pellagra was an infectious disease. The germ theory of disease had recently become popular in not only the medical field but also the public's consciousness. As a result, the germ theory was often generalized to far more ailments than it actually caused. Goldberger, in contrast, suspected that diet was the true cause, which he came to believe through his observation that hospital staff who worked closely with pellagra patients did not fall sick themselves. Furthermore, pellagra cases were overwhelmingly poor Southerners, especially African Americans and sharecroppers. This was a group that often ate filling and starchy but nutrient-poor foods, especially those derived from corn.

His investigation into pellagra led him to conduct two parallel experiments starting in 1914. In one study, he investigated two orphanages that were experiencing rampant pellagra. A group of 172 orphans had the disease already, while 168 subjects did not. With federal funding, he switched them to a more varied diet that included fresh meat, vegetables, milk, and eggs. After several weeks, there were no new cases and almost all of the afflicted orphans had recovered. In the two years of the study, there was only one new case.

His next experiment took place at the Georgia State Sanitarium, the largest mental asylum in the South. Like the orphanages, the asylum had high rates of pellagra. However, this experiment included both an experimental and a control group. Also, he studied two categories of human subjects: black women and white women. By assessing their dietary intake, Goldberger aimed to test his hypothesis. The control group continued receiving the same food as before, but the experimental group was given a more balanced diet. Over the two-year span, half of the control group was sick while everyone on the varied diet recovered. In fact, the latter group improved so much that there was a high dropout rate, since many subjects became well enough to leave the institution. Unfortunately, after the study, the funding for more nutritious food dried up and the pellagra rates in the orphanages and asylum returned to pre-study levels.

Goldberger's next objective was to confirm the relationship between poor diet and pellagra. To do this, he met with Earl L. Brewer, the governor of Mississippi, in 1915. He requested access to prisoners of the Rankin State Prison Farm to try and induce pellagra in them. He chose this prison in particular because it previously had no cases of pellagra. After negotiation, Earl accepted Goldberger's request in return for pardons for the prisoners (some of whom had connections with the governor).

Goldberger experimented on 11 healthy volunteers from the Rankin State Prison Farm for this 9-month study. The subjects were put on a strict and heavily monitored corn-based diet lacking meat, milk, and vegetables. Goldberger observed that the subjects became weaker and weaker as the days went on. After six months, five of the eleven patients contracted pellagra and the rest had symptoms corresponding to pellagra. The prisoners reported enduring agony once they were afflicted, and some even tried to drop out of the study but were prevented from doing so. Despite his careful experiments, Goldberger's discovery proved socially and politically unacceptable, and he made little progress in gaining support for the treatment of pellagra. Besides the popularity of the germ theory, opposition also came from Southern leaders who resented a Northerner claiming that the pellagra outbreak was a product of the region's widespread poverty. Consequently, Goldberger became extremely frustrated. He conducted one final experiment, referred to as "filth parties", to silence the critics. In 1916, he injected 16 volunteers—including himself, his wife, and his assistant—with pellagric blood over 7 trials. Afterwards they experienced diarrhea and nausea but did not contract the disease. However, this effort too was rejected by critics for using almost entirely male subjects when pellagra was supposedly more common in females.

Though Goldberger established a clear link between pellagra and diet, he never discovered the specific nutrient deficiency that caused it. It was not until 1937 that Conrad Elvehjem discovered that pellagra is caused by a dietary lack of the B vitamin niacin, along with reduced levels of the essential amino acid tryptophan. Tom Spies also contributed to this finding.

== Death and legacy ==
Goldberger died of renal cell carcinoma in Washington, D.C., on January 19, 1929, at the age of 54. Upon his death, Goldberger's wife received a $125-a-month pension thanks to a special congressional bill that recognized the value of his work.

Goldberger's pellagra experiments were featured in Paul de Kruif's book "Hunger Fighters". (1928) Ironically, Nazi scientists, including Georg August Weltz who were among the first to propose that criminals be used for very high-altitude experiments cited de Kruif's book and his description of Goldberger's experiments with convict volunteers as the inspiration for their own infamous experiments with witting and unwitting convict subjects.

Goldberger was nominated four times for the Nobel Prize (1916, 1925, and twice in 1929).

In 1940, John Nesbitt produced a short film about Goldberger titled A Way in the Wilderness, directed by Fred Zinnemann and starring Shepperd Strudwick.

The story of Goldberger's research on pellagra was featured in the 2008 Michael Mosley BBC Four documentary mini-series Medical Mavericks: The History of Self-Experimentation and on a 2012 episode of the Science Channel TV show, Dark Matters: Twisted But True.

The radio program Cavalcade of America in 1940 had an episode called "The Red Death" about Goldberger's research on pellagra starring Ray Collins and Agnes Moorehead.

Goldberger's papers are held at the National Library of Medicine in Bethesda, Maryland.

== See also ==
- Takaki Kanehiro
