= Gaspar Casal =

Catalan physician

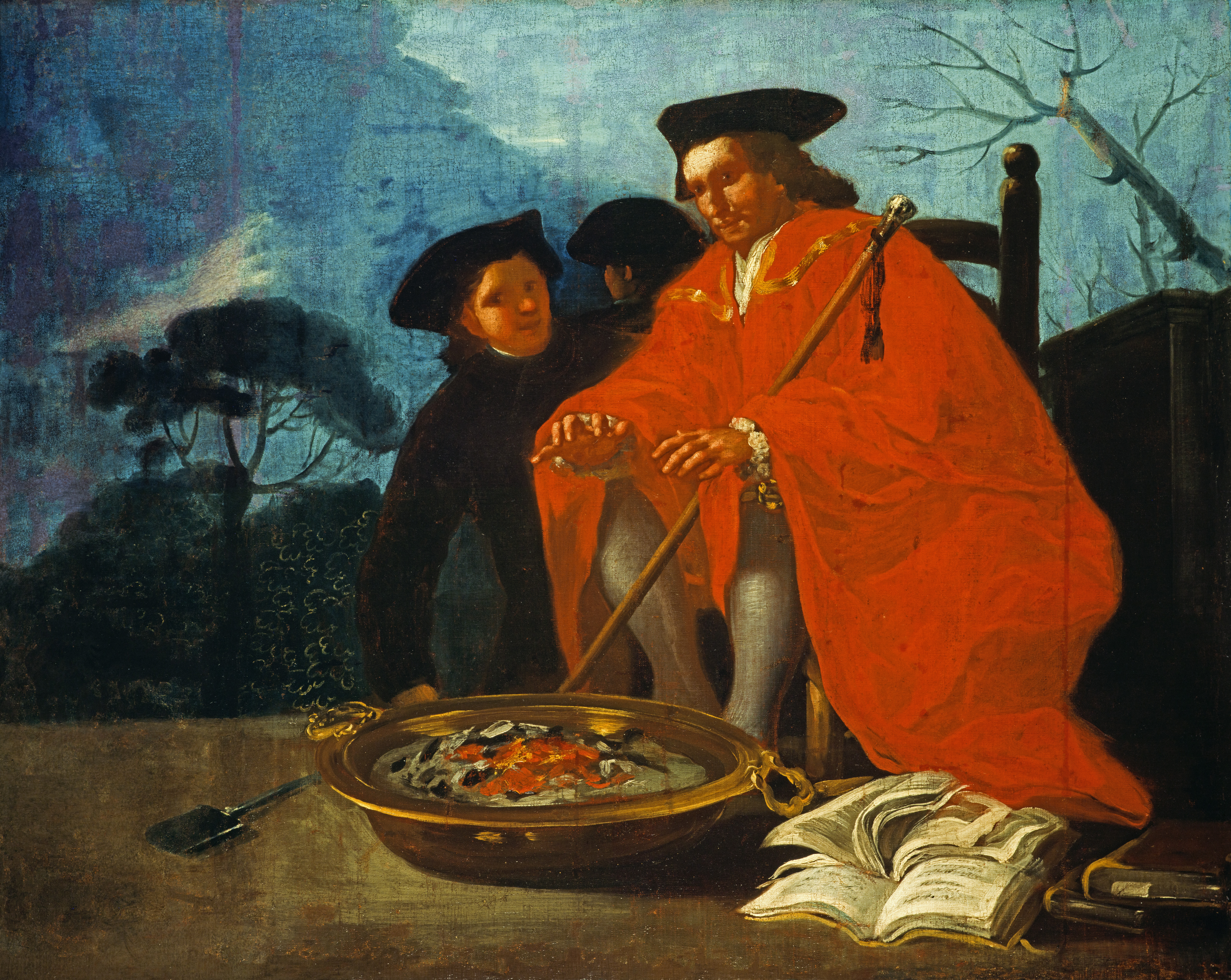
The Doctor by Francisco Goya, 1779

Gaspar Roque Francisco Narciso Casal Julian (31 December 1681 – 10 August 1759) was a Spanish physician remembered for describing the Casal collar in pellagra.

Casal was born in Girona Catalonia, Spain to Federico Casal y Dajón and Magdalena Julian. He grew up in Utrillas and is thought to have apprenticed at Atienza with Juan Manuel Rodriguez de Lima, an apothecary to Pope Innocent XI. He practiced medicine in Oviedo from 1720 to 1751, at which time he moved to Madrid as King Ferdinand's physician. He became a friend of Fr. Benito Feyjóo y Montenegro and Fr. Martin Sarmiento who encouraged his studies. He described pellagra in a book published in 1762, calling it mal de la rose due to the red rash seen on the hands and feet of sufferers. His “Historia affectionum quarundam regionis hujus familiarum” described scabies and treatment using sulfur ointment. He wrote on the natural history of Asturias which was published posthumously in 1762.

Casal married Maria Ruiz and had two sons. After her death he married Maria Álvarez Rodríguez Arango and had two more children.
