= SRT-3025 =

Organic compound, experimental pharmaceuticum

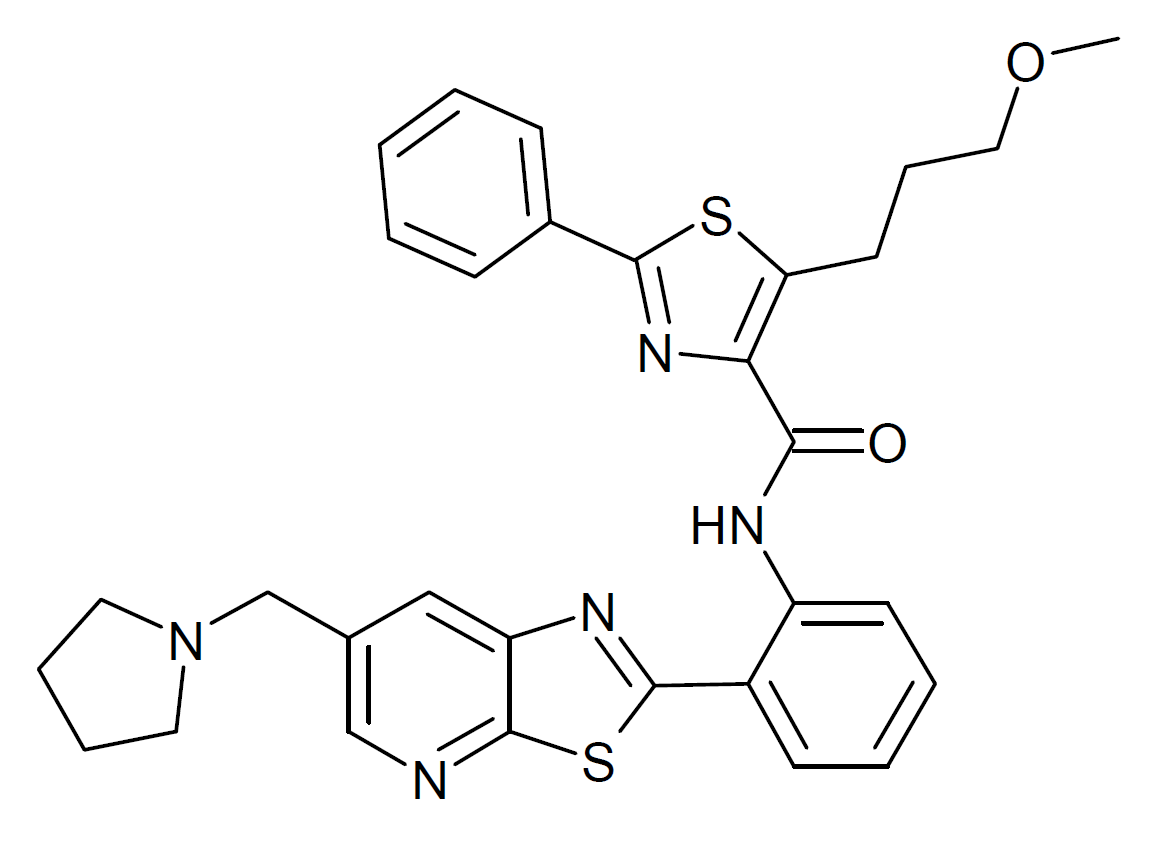

Identifiers
- IUPAC name: 5-(3-methoxypropyl)-2-phenyl-N-[2-[6-(pyrrolidin-1-ylmethyl)-[1,3]thiazolo[5,4-b]pyridin-2-yl]phenyl]-1,3-thiazole-4-carboxamide
- CAS Number: 1231952-55-8
- PubChem CID: 46245047
- UNII: L4WQ6846SR
- CompTox Dashboard (EPA): DTXSID301336673

Chemical and physical data
- Formula: C_{31}H_{31}N_{5}O_{2}S_{2}
- Molar mass: 569.74 g·mol^{−1}
- 3D model (JSmol): Interactive image
- SMILES: COCCCC1=C(N=C(S1)C2=CC=CC=C2)C(=O)NC3=CC=CC=C3C4=NC5=C(S4)N=CC(=C5)CN6CCCC6
- InChI: InChI=1S/C31H31N5O2S2/c1-38-17-9-14-26-27(35-29(39-26)22-10-3-2-4-11-22)28(37)33-24-13-6-5-12-23(24)30-34-25-18-21(19-32-31(25)40-30)20-36-15-7-8-16-36/h2-6,10-13,18-19H,7-9,14-17,20H2,1H3,(H,33,37); Key:MRRXPMZNBRXCPZ-UHFFFAOYSA-N

SRT-3025 is an experimental drug that was studied by Sirtris Pharmaceuticals as a small-molecule activator of the sirtuin subtype SIRT1. It has been investigated as a potential treatment for osteoporosis, and anemia.

== See also ==
- SRT-1460
- SRT-1720
- SRT-2104
- SRT-2183
- STAC-9
