= STAC-9 =

Organic compound, experimental pharmaceutical

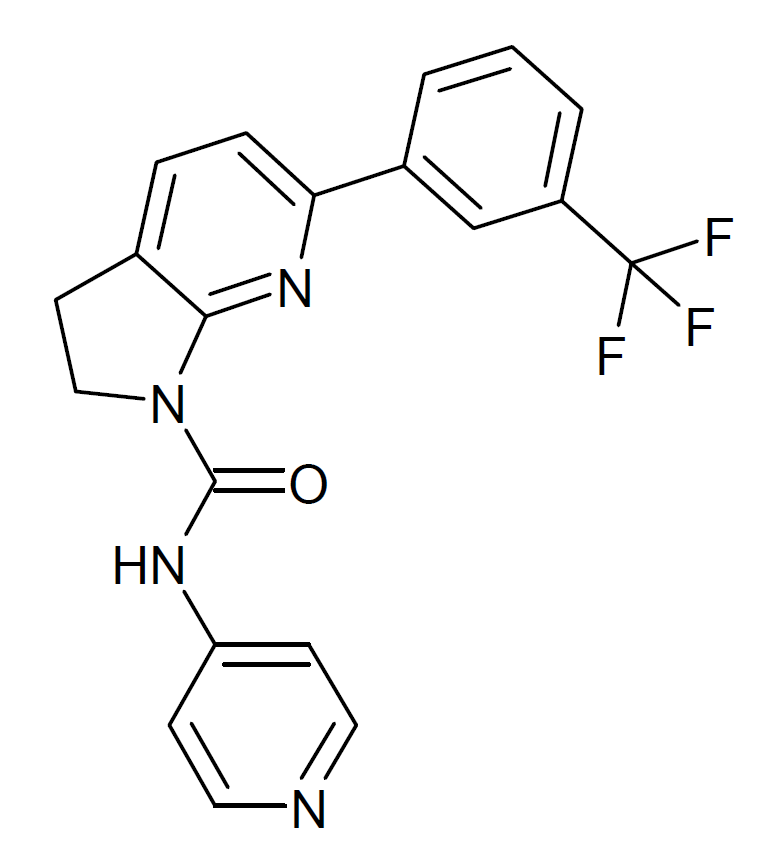

Identifiers
- IUPAC name: N-pyridin-4-yl-6-[3-(trifluoromethyl)phenyl]-2,3-dihydropyrrolo[2,3-b]pyridine-1-carboxamide
- CAS Number: 1303587-18-9
- PubChem CID: 68340804
- ChemSpider: 129324385
- UNII: MG7TTL8YCY
- CompTox Dashboard (EPA): DTXSID001336674

Chemical and physical data
- Formula: C_{20}H_{15}F_{3}N_{4}O
- Molar mass: 384.362 g·mol^{−1}
- 3D model (JSmol): Interactive image
- SMILES: C1CN(C2=C1C=CC(=N2)C3=CC(=CC=C3)C(F)(F)F)C(=O)NC4=CC=NC=C4
- InChI: InChI=1S/C20H15F3N4O/c21-20(22,23)15-3-1-2-14(12-15)17-5-4-13-8-11-27(18(13)26-17)19(28)25-16-6-9-24-10-7-16/h1-7,9-10,12H,8,11H2,(H,24,25,28); Key:WFPOEJCACZIDSN-UHFFFAOYSA-N

STAC-9 is an experimental drug that was developed by GlaxoSmithKline as a small-molecule activator of the sirtuin subtype SIRT1, with potential applications in the treatment of diabetes.

== See also ==
- SRT-1460
- SRT-1720
- SRT-2104
- SRT-2183
- SRT-3025
