= SRT-2104 =

Organic compound, experimental pharmaceuticum

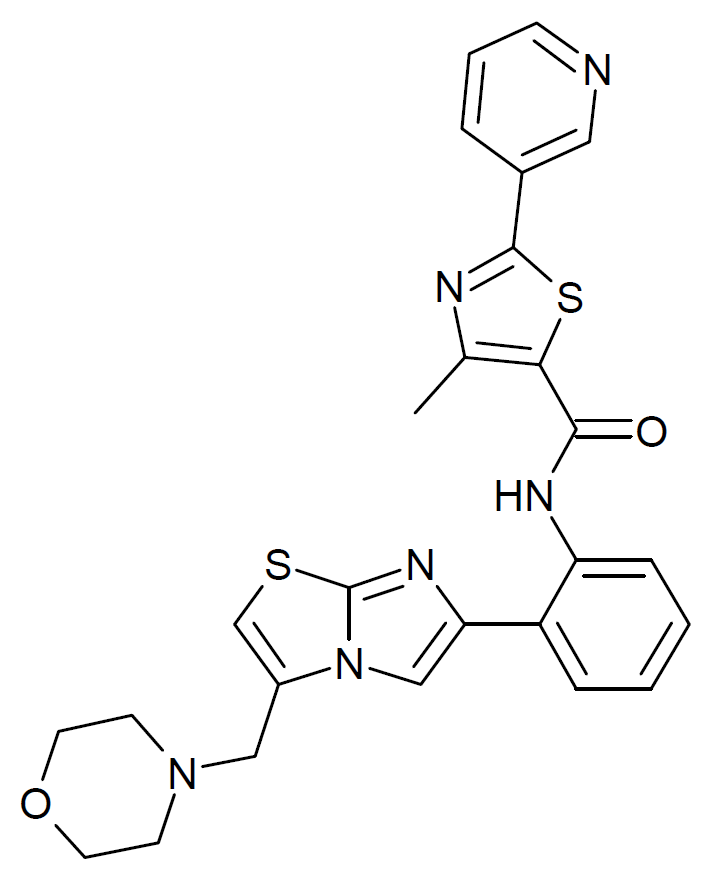

Identifiers
- IUPAC name: 4-methyl-N-[2-[3-(morpholin-4-ylmethyl)imidazo[2,1-b][1,3]thiazol-6-yl]phenyl]-2-pyridin-3-yl-1,3-thiazole-5-carboxamide
- CAS Number: 1093403-33-8
- PubChem CID: 25108829
- DrugBank: DB12186
- ChemSpider: 28637794
- UNII: 4521NR0J09
- ChEMBL: ChEMBL4297436
- CompTox Dashboard (EPA): DTXSID00648729

Chemical and physical data
- Formula: C_{26}H_{24}N_{6}O_{2}S_{2}
- Molar mass: 516.64 g·mol^{−1}
- 3D model (JSmol): Interactive image
- SMILES: CC1=C(SC(=N1)C2=CN=CC=C2)C(=O)NC3=CC=CC=C3C4=CN5C(=CSC5=N4)CN6CCOCC6
- InChI: InChI=1S/C26H24N6O2S2/c1-17-23(36-25(28-17)18-5-4-8-27-13-18)24(33)29-21-7-3-2-6-20(21)22-15-32-19(16-35-26(32)30-22)14-31-9-11-34-12-10-31/h2-8,13,15-16H,9-12,14H2,1H3,(H,29,33); Key:LAMQVIQMVKWXOC-UHFFFAOYSA-N

SRT-2104 is an experimental drug that was studied by Sirtris Pharmaceuticals as a small-molecule activator of the sirtuin subtype SIRT1. The compound progressed to Phase II human trials for Type II diabetes before development was discontinued, however it continues to be widely used in animal research into the functions of SIRT1.

== See also ==
- SRT-1460
- SRT-1720
- SRT-2183
- SRT2379
- SRT-3025
- STAC-9
