= Sirtuin 2 =

Protein-coding gene in the species Homo sapiens

SIRT2
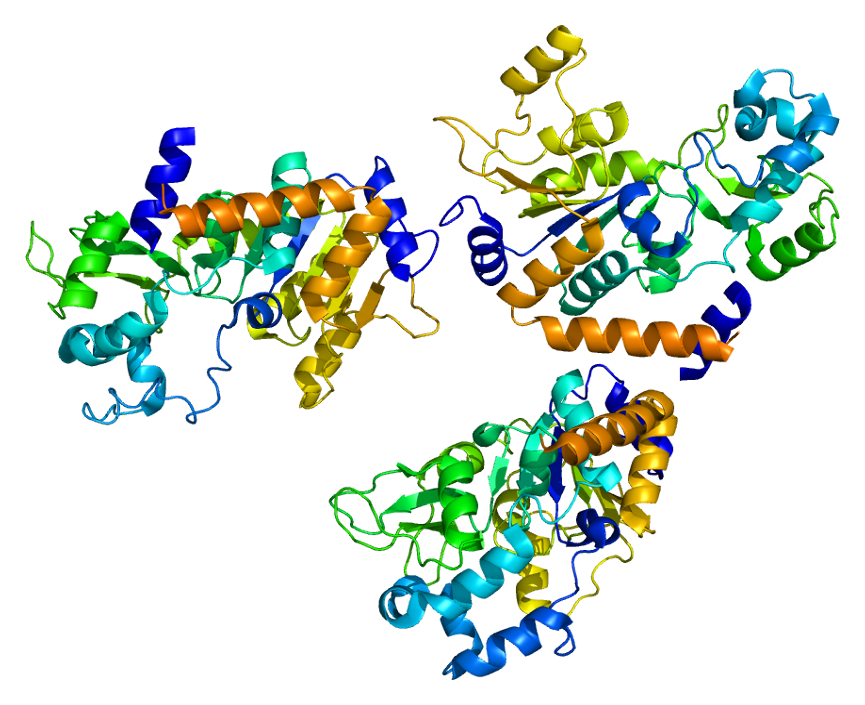

Identifiers
- Aliases: SIRT2, SIR2, SIR2L, SIR2L2, sirtuin 2
- External IDs: OMIM: 604480; MGI: 1927664; GeneCards: SIRT2
Available structures
PDB	Ortholog search: PDBe RCSB
PDB	List of PDB id codes 1J8F, 3ZGO, 3ZGV, 4L3O, 4R8M, 4RMG, 4RMH, 4RMI, 4RMJ, 4Y6O, 5DY4, 5D7O, 5DY5, 4Y6L, 4Y6Q, 4X3O, 4X3P, 5D7P, 5D7Q, 5FYQ
Enzyme activity
EC #	BRENDA	ExPASy	KEGG	MetaCyc
2.3.1.286	↗	↗	↗	↗

Gene location (Human)
Chr.	Chromosome 19 (human)
Band	19q13.2	Start	38,878,555 bp
Band	19q13.2	End	38,899,862 bp

Gene location (Mouse)
Chr.	Chromosome 7 (mouse)
Band	7|7 B1	Start	28,466,160 bp
Band	7|7 B1	End	28,488,086 bp
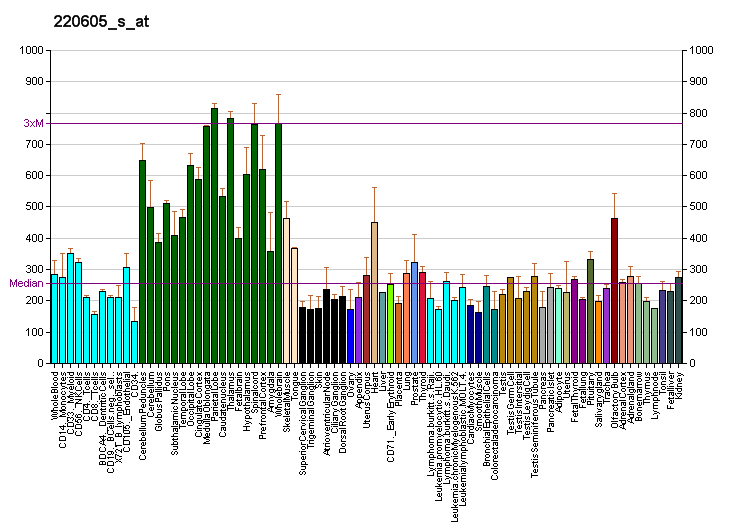
RNA expression pattern
Bgee	Human / Mouse (ortholog); Top expressed in: C1 segment; muscle of thigh; gastrocnemius muscle; right frontal lobe; Brodmann area 9; anterior cingulate cortex; right hemisphere of cerebellum; hypothalamus; amygdala; tibial nerve / Top expressed in: optic nerve; deep cerebellar nuclei; globus pallidus; median eminence; pontine nuclei; genital tubercle; internal carotid artery; lateral geniculate nucleus; dorsal tegmental nucleus; sciatic nerve; More reference expression data
BioGPS	More reference expression data
Gene ontology
Molecular function	histone deacetylase binding; transcription factor binding; metal ion binding; protein deacetylase activity; zinc ion binding; chromatin binding; protein binding; histone acetyltransferase binding; tubulin deacetylase activity; NAD-dependent histone deacetylase activity (H4-K16 specific); NAD-dependent protein deacetylase activity; histone deacetylase activity; ubiquitin binding; NAD+ binding; beta-tubulin binding; NAD+ ADP-ribosyltransferase activity; hydrolase activity; NAD-dependent histone deacetylase activity
Cellular component	cytoplasm; cytosol; membrane; microtubule organizing center; chromatin silencing complex; perinuclear region of cytoplasm; paranode region of axon; microtubule; cytoskeleton; nucleus; centrosome; cell projection; myelin sheath; glial cell projection; Schmidt-Lanterman incisure; paranodal junction; perikaryon; growth cone; spindle; chromosome; lateral loop; mitotic spindle; meiotic spindle; midbody; centriole; juxtaparanode region of axon; telomere; nucleolus; mitochondrion; plasma membrane
Biological process	cellular response to molecule of bacterial origin; positive regulation of proteasomal ubiquitin-dependent protein catabolic process involved in cellular response to hypoxia; cellular response to epinephrine stimulus; tubulin deacetylation; rDNA heterochromatin assembly; phosphatidylinositol 3-kinase signaling; cell cycle; positive regulation of DNA binding; negative regulation of autophagy; cellular response to hypoxia; negative regulation of cell population proliferation; proteasome-mediated ubiquitin-dependent protein catabolic process; cellular lipid catabolic process; histone H3 deacetylation; peptidyl-lysine deacetylation; negative regulation of fat cell differentiation; regulation of transcription, DNA-templated; substantia nigra development; negative regulation of protein catabolic process; negative regulation of NLRP3 inflammasome complex assembly; negative regulation of oligodendrocyte progenitor proliferation; regulation of fat cell differentiation; transcription, DNA-templated; myelination in peripheral nervous system; histone H4 deacetylation; regulation of myelination; innate immune response; hepatocyte growth factor receptor signaling pathway; positive regulation of proteasomal ubiquitin-dependent protein catabolic process; regulation of exit from mitosis; cell differentiation; protein ADP-ribosylation; immune system process; cellular response to hepatocyte growth factor stimulus; negative regulation of peptidyl-threonine phosphorylation; regulation of phosphorylation; negative regulation of transcription by RNA polymerase II; nervous system development; response to redox state; protein deacetylation; positive regulation of attachment of spindle microtubules to kinetochore; meiosis; cellular response to caloric restriction; ripoptosome assembly involved in necroptotic process; negative regulation of transcription from RNA polymerase II promoter in response to hypoxia; negative regulation of transcription, DNA-templated; negative regulation of defense response to bacterium; positive regulation of execution phase of apoptosis; protein kinase B signaling; negative regulation of striated muscle tissue development; positive regulation of oocyte maturation; regulation of cell cycle; cell division; autophagy; positive regulation of meiotic nuclear division; cellular response to oxidative stress; negative regulation of reactive oxygen species metabolic process; histone deacetylation; positive regulation of cell division; positive regulation of transcription by RNA polymerase II
Sources:Amigo / QuickGO
Orthologs
Databases	NCBI: entry; OMA: entry
Species	Human	Mouse
Entrez	22933	64383
Ensembl	ENSG00000283100; ENSG00000068903	ENSMUSG00000015149
UniProt	Q8IXJ6	Q8VDQ8
RefSeq (mRNA)	NM_001193286; NM_012237; NM_030593	NM_001122765; NM_001122766; NM_022432
RefSeq (protein)	NP_001180215; NP_036369; NP_085096	NP_001116237; NP_001116238; NP_071877
Location (UCSC)	Chr 19: 38.88 – 38.9 Mb	Chr 7: 28.47 – 28.49 Mb
PubMed search
- Wikidata
View/Edit Human	View/Edit Mouse

NAD-dependent deacetylase sirtuin 2 is an enzyme that in humans is encoded by the SIRT2 gene. SIRT2 is an NAD+ (nicotinamide adenine dinucleotide)-dependent deacetylase. Studies of this protein have often been divergent, highlighting the dependence of pleiotropic effects of SIRT2 on cellular context. The natural polyphenol resveratrol is known to exert opposite actions on neural cells according to their normal or cancerous status. Similar to other sirtuin family members, SIRT2 displays a ubiquitous distribution. SIRT2 is expressed in a wide range of tissues and organs and has been detected particularly in metabolically relevant tissues, including the brain, muscle, liver, testes, pancreas, kidney, and adipose tissue of mice. Of note, SIRT2 expression is much higher in the brain than all other organs studied, particularly in the cortex, striatum, hippocampus, and spinal cord.

== Function ==
Studies suggest that the human sirtuins may function as intracellular regulatory proteins with mono-ADP-ribosyltransferase activity. Cytosolic functions of SIRT2 include the regulation of microtubule acetylation, control of myelination in the central and peripheral nervous system and gluconeogenesis. There is growing evidence for additional functions of SIRT2 in the nucleus. During the G2/M transition, nuclear SIRT2 is responsible for global deacetylation of H4K16, facilitating H4K20 methylation and subsequent chromatin compaction. In response to DNA damage, SIRT2 was also found to deacetylate H3K56 in vivo. Finally, SIRT2 negatively regulates the acetyltransferase activity of the transcriptional co-activator p300 via deacetylation of an automodification loop within its catalytic domain.

== Structure ==
=== Gene ===
Human SIRT2 gene has 18 exons resides on chromosome 19 at q13. For SIRT2, four different human splice variants are deposited in the GenBank sequence database.

=== Protein ===
SIRT2 gene encodes a member of the sirtuin family of proteins, homologs to the yeast Sir2 protein. Members of the sirtuin family are characterized by a sirtuin core domain and grouped into four classes. The protein encoded by this gene is included in class I of the sirtuin family. Several transcript variants are resulted from alternative splicing of this gene. Only transcript variants 1 and 2 have confirmed protein products of physiological relevance. A leucine-rich nuclear export signal (NES) within the N-terminal region of these two isoforms is identified. Since deletion of the NES led to nucleocytoplasmic distribution, it is suggested to mediate their cytosolic localization.

== Selective ligands ==
Numerous selective inhibitors of SIRT2 are known as they have antiviral effects and potential application in cancer treatment, though none of them has been conclusively shown to be highly selective for SIRT2 over all other SIRT subtypes. No highly selective activators of SIRT2 are known at present with non selective activators such as nicotinamide riboside mainly used for research.

=== Activators ===
- 1-Aminoanthracene and propofol - activate SIRT2 activity on some substrates but inhibit it on others
- Nicotinamide riboside - activates SIRT2, but non selective
- Metformin - activates SIRT2 but has several other mechanisms of action as well
- SRT1720 - primarily a SIRT1 activator, but also weakly activates SIRT2
- Hexapeptide-12 (VGVAPG) - upregulates SIRT2 gene expression through an indirect pathway

=== Inhibitors ===
- (S)-2-Pentyl-6-chloro,8-bromo-chroman-4-one: IC_{50} of 1.5 μM, highly selective over SIRT1 and SIRT3
- 3′-Phenethyloxy-2-anilinobenzamide (33i): IC_{50} of 0.57 μM
- AGK2 (C_{23}H_{13}C_{l2}N_{3}O_{2}; 2-cyano-3-[5-(2,5-dichlorophenyl)-2-furanyl]-N-5-quinolinyl-2-propenamide) is a potent, cell-permeable, selective SIRT2 inhibitor that minimally affects both SIRT1 and SIRT3
- FLS-359
- Isobavachalcone
- RK-9123016
- RW-93
- SirReal2
- Thiomyristoyl

== Animal studies ==
=== Metabolic actions ===
SIRT2 suppresses inflammatory responses in mice through p65 deacetylation and inhibition of NF-κB activity. SIRT2 is responsible for the deacetylation and activation of G6PD, stimulating pentose phosphate pathway to supply cytosolic NADPH to counteract oxidative damage and protect mouse erythrocytes.

=== Neurodegeneration ===
Several studies in cell and invertebrate models of Parkinson's disease (PD) and Huntington's disease (HD) suggested potential neuroprotective effects of SIRT2 inhibition, in striking contrast with other sirtuin family members. In addition, recent evidence shows that inhibition of SIRT2 protects against MPTP-induced neuronal loss in vivo.

== Clinical significance ==
=== Metabolic actions ===
Several SIRT2 deacetylation targets play important roles in metabolic homeostasis. SIRT2 inhibits adipogenesis by deacetylating FOXO1 and thus may protect against insulin resistance. SIRT2 sensitizes cells to the action of insulin by physically interacting with and activating Akt and downstream targets. SIRT2 mediates mitochondrial biogenesis by deacetylating PGC-1α, upregulates antioxidant enzyme expression by deacetylating FOXO3a, and thereby reduces ROS levels. Also, Sirt2 can reactivate the inactive G6PD by removing the acetyaltion at K403.

=== Cell cycle regulation ===
Although preferentially cytosolic, SIRT2 transiently shuttles to the nucleus during the G2/M transition of the cell cycle, where it has a strong preference for histone H4 lysine 16 (H4K16ac), thereby regulating chromosomal condensation during mitosis. During the cell cycle, SIRT2 associates with several mitotic structures including the centrosome, mitotic spindle, and midbody, presumably to ensure normal cell division. Finally, cells with SIRT2 overexpression exhibit marked prolongation of the cell cycle.

=== Tumorigenesis ===
Mounting evidence implies a role for SIRT2 in tumorigenesis. SIRT2 may suppress or promote tumor growth in a context-dependent manner. SIRT2 has been proposed to act as a tumor suppressor by preventing chromosomal instability during mitosis. SIRT2-specific inhibitors exhibits broad anticancer activity.

== Interactions ==
SIRT2 has been shown to interact with:

- α-tubulin,
- TUG,
- β-catenin,
- PGAM2,
- TIAM1,
- ApoE4,
- p53,
- PEPCK,
- FOXO1,
- p300,
- 14-3-3 protein,
- G6PD, and
- CBP.
