= Mir-34 microRNA precursor family =

MicroRNA precuror family

mir-34 microRNA precursor family
- Predicted secondary structure and sequence conservation of mir-34

Identifiers
- Symbol: mir-34
- Rfam: RF00456
- miRBase: MI0000268
- miRBase family: MIPF0000039

Other data
- RNA type: Gene; miRNA
- Domain: Eukaryota
- GO: GO:0035195 GO:0035068
- SO: SO:0001244
- PDB structures: PDBe

The miR-34 microRNA precursor family are non-coding RNA molecules that, in mammals, give rise to three major mature miRNAs. The miR-34 family members were discovered computationally and later verified experimentally. The precursor miRNA stem-loop is processed in the cytoplasm of the cell, with the predominant miR-34 mature sequence excised from the 5' arm of the hairpin.

== The miR-34 family ==
In mammals, three miR-34 precursors are produced from two transcriptional units. The human miR-34a precursor is transcribed from chromosome 1. The miR-34b and miR-34c precursors are co-transcribed from a region on chromosome 11, apparently as part of a transcript known as BC021736.

Expression of MIR34A (gene) in mouse is observed in all tissues examined but is highest in brain. miR-34b and -c are relatively less abundant in most tissues, but are the predominant miR-34 species in lung. The presence of miR-34 products has also been confirmed in embryonic stem cells. miR-34 has been shown to be maternally inherited in Drosophila and zebrafish and the loss of miR-34 resulted in defects in hindbrain development in zebrafish embryos. This was the first report of knockdown phenotype of miR-34 in any model organism although the phenotype was observed in only about 30% of zebrafish embryos.

== Targets of miR-34 ==
Yamakuchi et al.. showed that miR-34a targets the silent information regulator 1 (SIRT1) gene:

"miR-34 inhibition of SIRT1 leads to an increase in acetylated p53 and expression of p21 and PUMA, transcriptional targets of p53 that regulate the cell cycle and apoptosis, respectively. Furthermore, miR-34 suppression of SIRT1 ultimately leads to apoptosis in WT human colon cancer cells but not in human colon cancer cells lacking p53. Finally, miR-34a itself is a transcriptional target of p53, suggesting a positive feedback loop between p53 and miR-34a. Thus, miR-34a functions as a tumor suppressor, in part, through a SIRT1-p53 pathway."

Recently Quantitative proteomics – SILAC approach was used to identify miR-34a targets at genome level in HEK293T cells.

== miR-34 inhibits human p53-mutant gastric cancer tumorspheres ==
p53-deficient human gastric cancer cells, restoration of functional miR-34 inhibits cell growth and induces chemosensitization and apoptosis, indicating that miR-34 may restore p53 function. Restoration of miR-34 inhibits tumorsphere formation and growth, which is reported to be correlated to the self-renewal of cancer stem cells. The mechanism of miR-34-mediated suppression of self-renewal appears to be related to the direct modulation of downstream targets Bcl-2, Notch, and HMGA2, indicating that miR-34 may be involved in gastric cancer stem cell self-renewal/differentiation decision-making. miR-34c has also been associated to bone development and bone cancer.
