= Howitz =

Howitz may refer to:

- Howitzer, a type of artillery gun
- Konrad Howitz, the sirtuin activating compounds discoverer
