= 4-Bromoresveratrol =

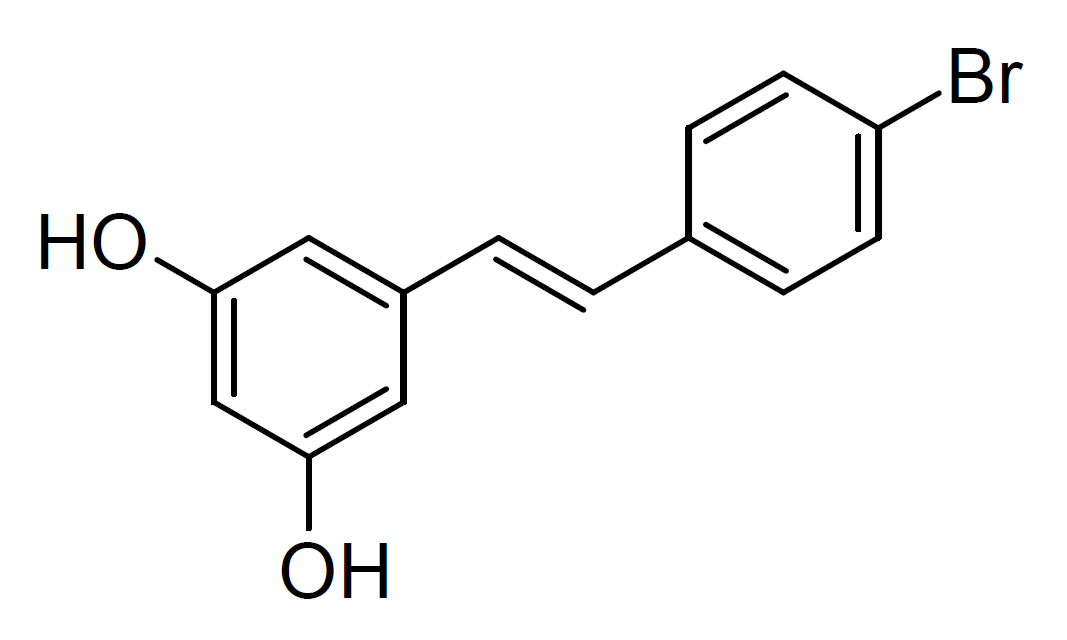

Identifiers
- IUPAC name: 5-[(E)-2-(4-bromophenyl)ethenyl]benzene-1,3-diol
- CAS Number: 1224713-90-9
- PubChem CID: 18475115
- ChemSpider: 13447172
- ChEMBL: ChEMBL2208038
- ECHA InfoCard: 100.236.378

Chemical and physical data
- Formula: C_{14}H_{11}BrO_{2}
- Molar mass: 291.144 g·mol^{−1}
- 3D model (JSmol): Interactive image
- SMILES: C1=CC(=CC=C1/C=C/C2=CC(=CC(=C2)O)O)Br
- InChI: InChI=1S/C14H11BrO2/c15-12-5-3-10(4-6-12)1-2-11-7-13(16)9-14(17)8-11/h1-9,16-17H/b2-1+; Key:NCJVLKFAQIWASE-OWOJBTEDSA-N

4-Bromoresveratrol is an experimental drug which is a synthetic derivative of the natural product resveratrol, and has been investigated for anti-cancer properties. Unlike resveratrol itself which acts as a sirtuin activator, 4-bromoresveratrol acts as a selective inhibitor of the sirtuin enzymes SIRT1 and SIRT3. In animal models, it inhibits growth of melanomas and inhibited development of cancer stem cells in gastric cancer tissues.
