= SZC =

SZC may refer to:

- Sizewell C nuclear power station, a proposed power station in Suffolk, England
- Sodium zirconium cyclosilicate, a medication used to treat high blood potassium sold under the brand name Lokelma
- Slovak Cycling Federation (Slovak: Slovenský Zväz Cyklistiky), the governing body for cycle racing in Slovakia
- Sözcü TV, a YouTube channel operated by Sözcü, a Turkish daily newspaper
- szc, the ISO 639-3 code for Semaq Beri language, an Austroasiatic language spoken in Malaysia

== See also ==
- SZC-6, a drug from the coumarin family which acts as a sirtuin-3 (SIRT3) activator
- The Saul Zaentz Company, a former rights holder for J. R. R. Tolkien's The Hobbit and The Lord of the Rings
