= C23H24FN5O =

The molecular formula C_{23}H_{24}FN_{5}O (molar mass: 405.477 g/mol) may refer to:

- Taletrectinib
- 2-APQC
