= YC8-02 =

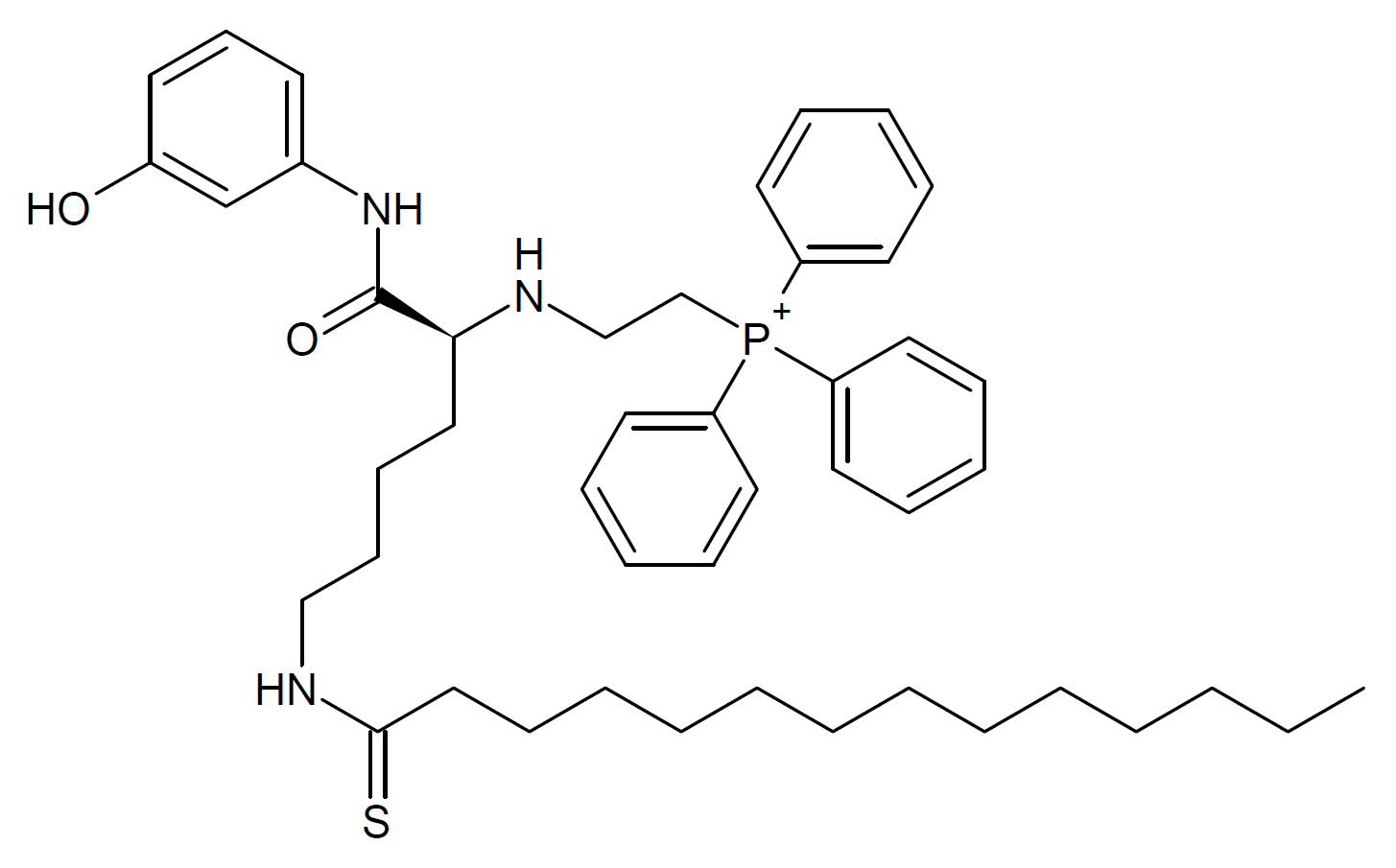

Clinical data
- Drug class: SIRT2/3 inhibitor

Identifiers
- IUPAC name: 2-[[(2S)-1-(3-hydroxyanilino)-1-oxo-6-(tetradecanethioylamino)hexan-2-yl]amino]ethyl-triphenylphosphanium
- PubChem CID: 177378251
- ChEMBL: ChEMBL5595757

Chemical and physical data
- Formula: C_{46}H_{63}N_{3}O_{2}PS
- Molar mass: 753.06 g·mol^{−1}
- 3D model (JSmol): Interactive image
- SMILES: CCCCCCCCCCCCCC(=S)NCCCC[C@@H](C(=O)NC1=CC(=CC=C1)O)NCC[P+](C2=CC=CC=C2)(C3=CC=CC=C3)C4=CC=CC=C4
- InChI: InChI=1S/C46H62N3O2PS/c1-2-3-4-5-6-7-8-9-10-11-21-34-45(53)48-35-23-22-33-44(46(51)49-39-25-24-26-40(50)38-39)47-36-37-52(41-27-15-12-16-28-41,42-29-17-13-18-30-42)43-31-19-14-20-32-43/h12-20,24-32,38,44,47H,2-11,21-23,33-37H2,1H3,(H2-,48,49,50,51,53)/p+1/t44-/m0/s1; Key:RIVWUGLXBPHZGR-SJARJILFSA-O

YC8-02 is a drug which acts as a potent inhibitor of the enzymes sirtuin 2 (SIRT2) and sirtuin 3 (SIRT3). It was developed from an older SIRT2 selective inhibitor thiomyristoyl, but substituted with a triphenylphosphine group which increases affinity to SIRT3 and selectively targets uptake into mitochondria. It is still relatively selective for SIRT2 with an IC_{50} of 62nM at SIRT2 vs 530nM at SIRT3, but this still makes it one of the most potent SIRT3 inhibitors currently available. In animal studies it is useful for the treatment of certain forms of blood cancer such as lymphoma and leukemia.

== See also ==
- Mitoquinone mesylate
