= Caloric restriction mimetic =

Hypothetical anti-aging dietary supplement or drug candidate

Calorie restriction mimetics (CRM), also known as energy restriction mimetics, are a hypothetical class of dietary supplements or drug candidates that would, in principle, mimic the substantial anti-aging effects that calorie restriction (CR) has on many laboratory animals and humans. CR is defined as a reduction in calorie intake of 20% (mild CR) to 50% (severe CR) without incurring malnutrition or a reduction in essential nutrients. An effective CRM would alter the key metabolic pathways involved in the effects of CR itself, leading to preserved youthful health and longer lifespan without the need to reduce food intake. The term was coined by Lane, Ingram, Roth of the National Institute on Aging in a seminal 1998 paper in the Journal of Anti-Aging Medicine, the forerunner of Rejuvenation Research. A number of genes and pathways have been shown to be involved with the actions of CR in model organisms and these represent attractive targets for drug discovery and for developing CRM. However, no effective CRM have been identified to date.

== Candidates ==
Candidate compounds include:

- Resveratrol (3,5,4'-trihydroxy-trans-stilbene) is a stilbenoid, a type of natural phenol, and a phytoalexin produced naturally by several plants, including grapes, and especially the roots of the Japanese Knotweed, from which it is extracted commercially. Resveratrol was proposed to be a CRM based on a series of early reports which found that it increased the lifespan of yeasts, the worm Caenorhabditis elegans, and fruit flies. Scientists involved in these studies went on to found Sirtris Pharmaceuticals, a company working to develop resveratrol analogs as proprietary drugs. This led many companies to produce and market resveratrol dietary supplements. However, studies by independent scientists have failed to replicate these results. Moreover, in every experiment to date, resveratrol at several doses has failed to extend the lifespan of lean, genetically normal mice or rats.
- The antidiabetic drug metformin was proposed as a possible CRM after it was found that mice administered the drug exhibit similar gene expression changes as CR mice. It is already clinically approved to treat diabetes, and has been used for this indication for the past 40 years. It enhances the sensitivity of insulin receptors on the surface of muscle and fat cells and activates genes that reduce the production of glucose by the liver, thus reducing the risk of non-enzymatic glycation and other age-related damage; these effects are also seen in CR. Subsequently, metformin was reported to extend the lifespan of short-lived or genetically cancer-prone mouse strains. However, two studies in rats and mice with normal genetics and longevity have found no effect of metformin on maximum lifespan, and only a very small effect on median lifespan.
- Oxaloacetate is a metabolic intermediate of the citric acid cycle. In the short-lived roundworm Caenorhabditis elegans, supplementation with oxaloacetate increases the ratio of reduced to oxidized nicotinamide adenine dinucleotide (NAD+:NADH) to activate AMPK and FOXO signaling pathways similar to what occurs in calorie restriction. The increase in the NAD+/NADH ratio is due to the reaction of oxaloacetate to malate in the cytoplasm via the enzyme malate dehydrogenase. In mitochondria that have been isolated out of cells and tested in oxaloacetate-enriched medium, this increase can be quite dramatic. Decreases in the NAD+/NADH ratio has been proposed as a carbohydrate metabolism-controlled cellular senescence mechanism. Because of its parallel effects on these pathways, oxaloacetate was proposed as a CR mimetic. In the short-lived roundworm Caenorhabditis elegans, supplementing the medium with oxaloacetate does increase average life expectancy; it was unclear whether it had an effect on maximum lifespan. However, when tested by two independent groups of scientists across four university laboratories, oxaloacetate supplements had no effect on lifespan in healthy laboratory mice.
- Rimonabant (Acomplia) is an anti-obesity drug initially approved for use in the European Union but later withdrawn due to psychiatric side effects including anxiety and depression. Rimonabant was never approved by the FDA for use in the United States. This is an endocannabinoid-1 receptor blocker. Endocannabinoids are cannabis-like chemicals that stimulate appetite and also regulate energy balance. Overstimulation of the endocannabinoid receptor in the hypothalamus promotes appetite and stimulates lipogenesis. It also blocks the beneficial actions of adiponectin. Rimonabant inhibits these and so it reduces appetite, balances energy, and increases adiponectin, which reduces intra-abdominal fat. It improves lipid profile, glucose tolerance, and waist measurement, and is therefore comparable in effect to calorie restriction (CR).
- Lipoic Acid (α-Lipoic Acid, Alpha Lipoic Acid, or ALA) has failed to extend lifespan in normal mice or rats in numerous studies, either alone or as part of combination therapy.
- 2-deoxy-D-glucose, or 2DG. 2-Deoxyglucose was the first agent pursued as a possible CRM. This compound inhibits glycolysis, and can mimic some of the physiological effects of CR, in particular increased insulin sensitivity, reduced glucose levels, reduced body temperature, and other biochemical changes. It was reported to extend the lives of C. elegans worms; however, studies in different strains of rats found that 2DG did not extend lifespan at several tested doses, and exhibited toxic effects. "Histopathological analysis of the hearts revealed increasing vacuolarization of cardiac myocytes with dose, and tissue staining revealed the vacuoles were free of both glycogen and lipid."
- It has been suggested that rapamycin, a drug that inhibits the mechanistic Target Of Rapamycin (mTOR) pathway, might be a CR mimetic. based on the responsiveness of mTORC1 activity to nutrient availability; the fact that mTOR activity is inhibited by CR; the fact that genetically inhibiting mTOR signaling extends maximum lifespan in invertebrate animals, and pharmacologically inhibiting mTOR with rapamycin extends maximum lifespan in both invertebrates and mice. While knocking out elements of the mTOR cascade seems to block the lifespan effects of rapamycin in invertebrate animals, surprisingly the effects of CR and rapamycin on metabolism and gene expression exhibit substantial differences in mice, with evidence suggesting that the mechanisms of the two anti-aging therapies may be in large part distinct and possibly additive.

Other candidate CRMs are:

- Glucosamine or its derivative n-acetylglucosamine have extended the life of both nematodes and mice.
- Peroxisome proliferator-activated receptor gamma inhibitors, such as Rosiglitazone and Gugulipids, working as insulin sensitizers, making fat cells more responsive to insulin by binding to their PPAR receptors
- Agents that modulate sirtuins (called STAC –sirtuin-activating compounds), for example, fisetin
- Exanadin (exenatide), a glucagon-like peptide-1 (GLP-1)modulator (originally discovered in the venom of the Gila monster) belongs to the group of incretin mimetics, facilitating glucose control.
- Adiponectin (together with leptin, it regulates adipose tissue metabolism. It is activated by PPAR inhibitors such as rosiglitazone)
- Acipimox
- Hydroxycitrate
- Dipeptidyl peptidase 4 (DPP-4) inhibitors
- Iodoacetate
- Mannoheptulose (glycolytic inhibitor)
- Modulators of neuropeptide Y (NPY)
- 4-Phenylbutyrate (PBA)
- Gymnemoside (modulates glucose absorption)
- Spermidine
