= RW-93 =

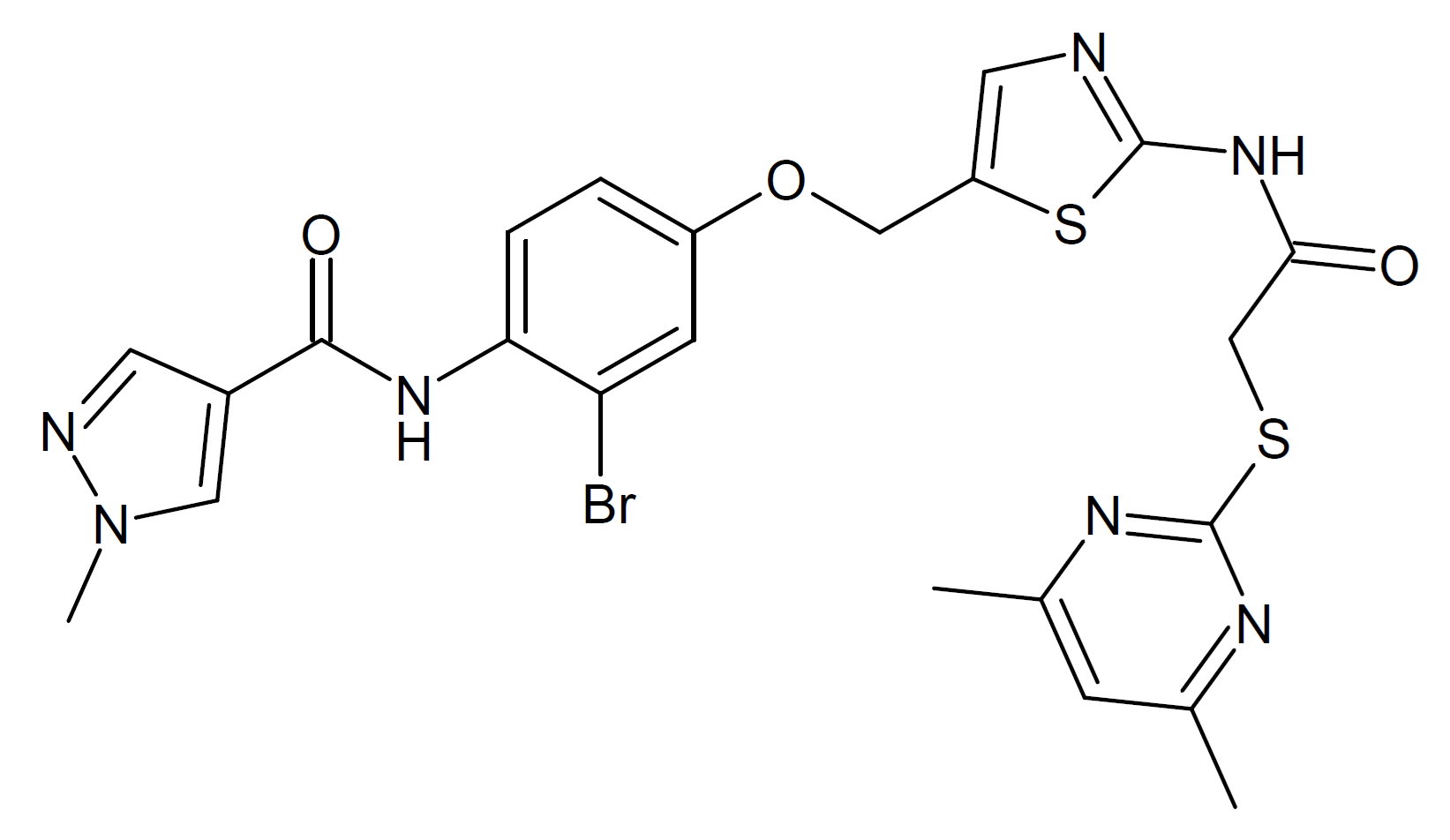

Clinical data
- Drug class: Sirtuin 2 (SIRT2) inhibitor

Chemical and physical data
- Formula: C_{23}H_{22}BrN_{7}O_{3}S_{2}
- Molar mass: 588.50 g·mol^{−1}
- 3D model (JSmol): Interactive image
- SMILES: O=C(Nc1ccc(cc1Br)OCc1cnc(s1)NC(=O)CSc1nc(C)cc(C)n1)c1cnn(C)c1
- InChI: InChI=InChI=1S/C23H22BrN7O3S2/c1-13-6-14(2)28-23(27-13)35-12-20(32)30-22-25-9-17(36-22)11-34-16-4-5-19(18(24)7-16)29-21(33)15-8-26-31(3)10-15/h4-10H,11-12H2,1-3H3,(H,29,33)(H,25,30,32); Key:LTSQUIAHBBIGDD-UHFFFAOYSA-N

RW-93 is a drug which acts as a potent and selective sirtuin 2 (SIRT2) inhibitor. It inhibits SIRT2 with an IC_{50} of 15.5 nM, and is highly selective over SIRT1, SIRT3 and SIRT5, however its activity has not been reported at SIRT4, SIRT6 or SIRT7. It represents a further development of FM358, which resulted from a lead-structure-based hybridization concept derived from SirReal2 and 24a. It was developed to assist with research into the role of SIRT2 in degenerative diseases such as Parkinson’s disease, Huntington’s disease, Alzheimer’s disease, and multiple sclerosis.
