= Butein =

- Chemical structure of butein

Names
- Preferred IUPAC name 2′,3,4,4′-Tetrahydroxychalcone
- Other names (2E)-1-(2,4-Dihydroxyphenyl)-3-(3,4-dihydroxyphenyl)prop-2-en-1-one; 2′,4′,3,4-Tetrahydroxychalcone; 3,4,2′,4′-Tetrahydroxychalcone

Identifiers
CAS Number	487-52-5
3D model (JSmol)	Interactive image
ChEBI	CHEBI:3237
ChEMBL	ChEMBL128000
ChemSpider	4444634
ECHA InfoCard	100.006.963
KEGG	C08578
PubChem CID	5281222
UNII	4WVS5M0LGF
CompTox Dashboard (EPA)	DTXSID101025569
- InChI: InChI=1S/C15H12O5/c16-10-3-4-11(14(19)8-10)12(17)5-1-9-2-6-13(18)15(20)7-9/h1-8,16,18-20H/b5-1+ Key: AYMYWHCQALZEGT-ORCRQEGFSA-N; InChI=1/C15H12O5/c16-10-3-4-11(14(19)8-10)12(17)5-1-9-2-6-13(18)15(20)7-9/h1-8,16,18-20H/b5-1+ Key: AYMYWHCQALZEGT-ORCRQEGFBV
- SMILES: C1=CC(=C(C=C1C=CC(=O)C2=C(C=C(C=C2)O)O)O)O

Properties
Chemical formula	C_{15}H_{12}O_{5}
Molar mass	272.256 g·mol^{−1}
- Except where otherwise noted, data are given for materials in their standard state (at 25 °C [77 °F], 100 kPa). verify (what is ?) Infobox references

Butein is a chalcone of the chalconoids. It can be found in Toxicodendron vernicifluum (or formerly Rhus verniciflua), Dahlia, Butea (Butea monosperma) and Coreopsis. It has antioxidative, aldose reductase and advanced glycation endproducts inhibitory effects. It is also a sirtuin-activating compound, a chemical compound having an effect on sirtuins, a group of enzymes that use NAD^{+} to remove acetyl groups from proteins. Buteins possess a high ability to inhibit aromatase process in the human body, for this reason, the use of these compounds in the treatment of breast cancer on the estrogen ground has been explored. The first attempts of sport pro-hormone supplementation with the use of buteins took place in Poland.
