= ADTL-SA1215 =

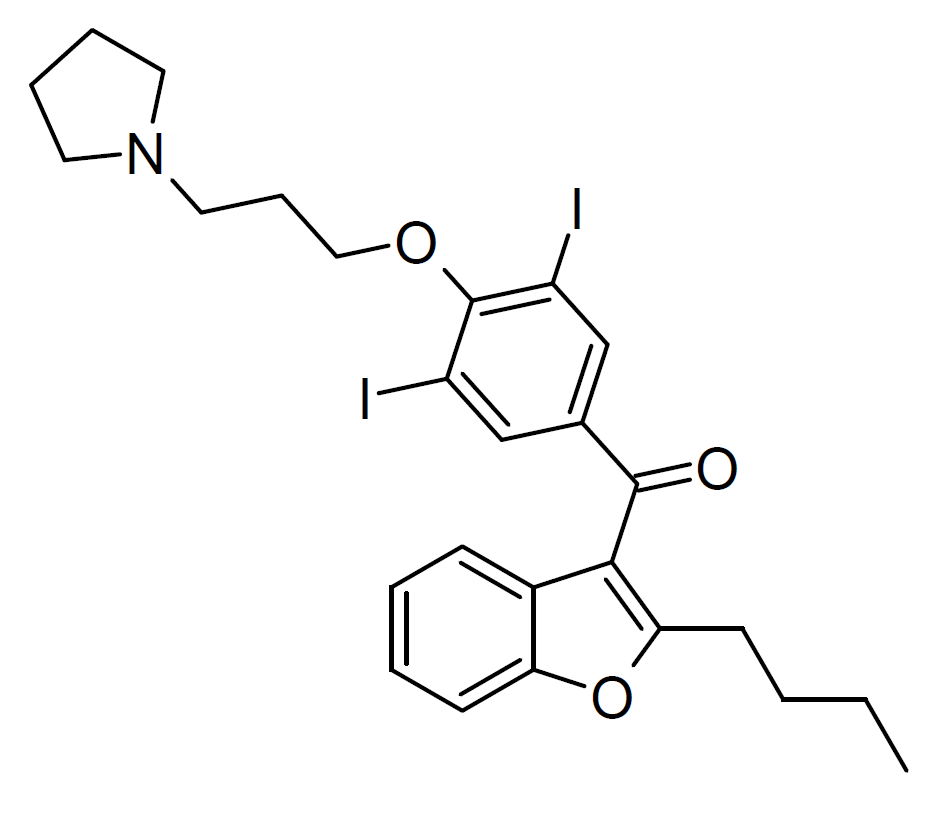

Clinical data
- Drug class: Sirtuin-3 (SIRT3) activator

Identifiers
- IUPAC name: (2-butyl-1-benzofuran-3-yl)-[3,5-diiodo-4-(3-pyrrolidin-1-ylpropoxy)phenyl]methanone
- CAS Number: 782387-91-1
- PubChem CID: 163323790

Chemical and physical data
- Formula: C_{26}H_{29}I_{2}N_{2}O_{3}
- Molar mass: 671.338 g·mol^{−1}
- 3D model (JSmol): Interactive image
- SMILES: CCCCC1=C(C2=CC=CC=C2O1)C(=O)C3=CC(=C(C(=C3)I)OCCCN4CCCC4)I
- InChI: InChI=1S/C26H29I2NO3/c1-2-3-10-23-24(19-9-4-5-11-22(19)32-23)25(30)18-16-20(27)26(21(28)17-18)31-15-8-14-29-12-6-7-13-29/h4-5,9,11,16-17H,2-3,6-8,10,12-15H2,1H3; Key:NKCYHTOLLMRNJO-UHFFFAOYSA-N

ADTL-SA1215 is a drug which acts as a sirtuin-3 (SIRT3) activator. It has been researched as a potential therapeutic agent for the treatment of triple negative breast cancer, as well as being used for basic research into the structure and function of the SIRT3 enzyme complex.
