= Thiomyristoyl =

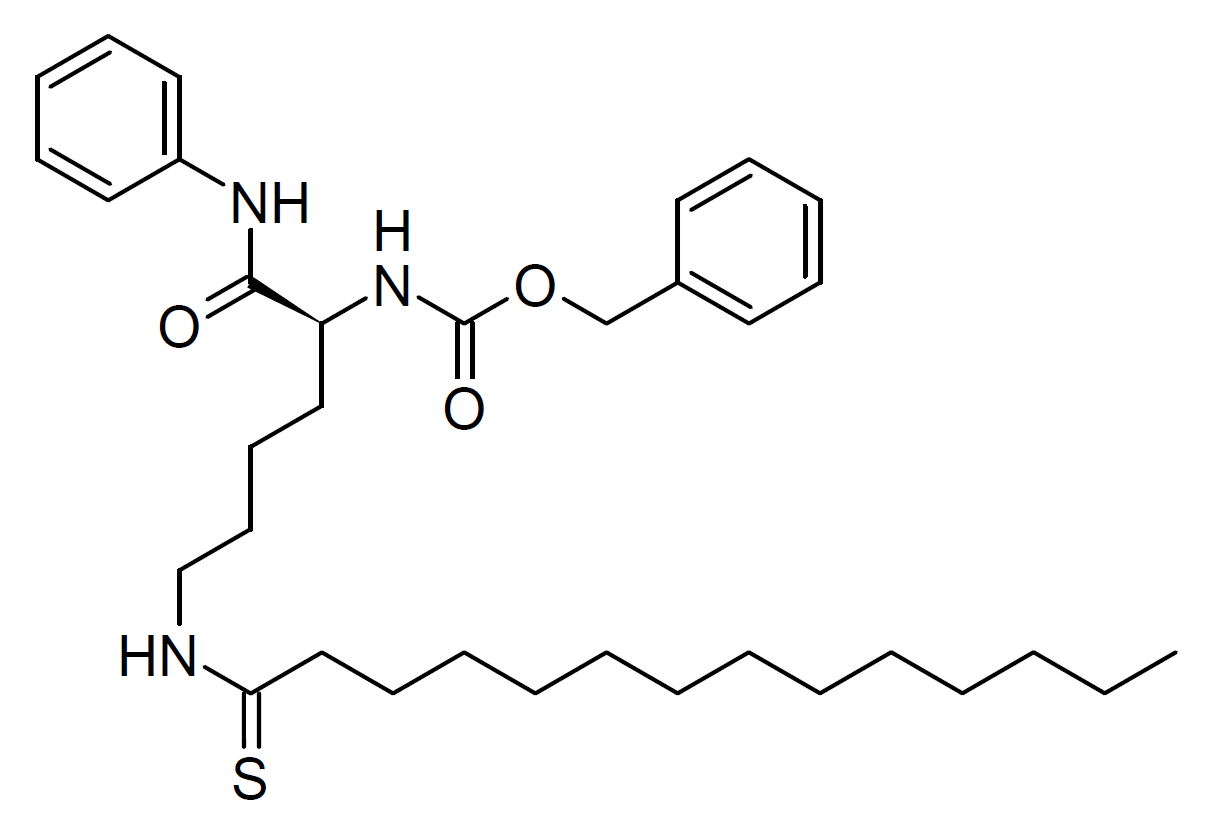

Clinical data
- Drug class: Sirtuin 2 (SIRT2) inhibitor

Identifiers
- IUPAC name: benzyl N-[(2S)-1-anilino-1-oxo-6-(tetradecanethioylamino)hexan-2-yl]carbamate
- CAS Number: 1429749-41-6
- PubChem CID: 126843233
- ChemSpider: 58843468
- ChEMBL: ChEMBL4129995

Chemical and physical data
- Formula: C_{34}H_{51}N_{3}O_{3}S
- Molar mass: 581.86 g·mol^{−1}
- 3D model (JSmol): Interactive image
- SMILES: CCCCCCCCCCCCCC(=S)NCCCC[C@@H](C(=O)NC1=CC=CC=C1)NC(=O)OCC2=CC=CC=C2
- InChI: InChI=1S/C34H51N3O3S/c1-2-3-4-5-6-7-8-9-10-11-18-26-32(41)35-27-20-19-25-31(33(38)36-30-23-16-13-17-24-30)37-34(39)40-28-29-21-14-12-15-22-29/h12-17,21-24,31H,2-11,18-20,25-28H2,1H3,(H,35,41)(H,36,38)(H,37,39)/t31-/m0/s1; Key:CJQGLLUJIVNREL-HKBQPEDESA-N

Thiomyristoyl is a drug which acts as a potent sirtuin 2 (SIRT2) inhibitor. It inhibits SIRT2 with an IC_{50} of 28 nM, though its activity at other SIRT subtypes has not been well characterized. It has beneficial effects in an animal model of ulcerative colitis, and is also used for studying the role of SIRT2 in cancer progression.

== See also ==
- YC8-02
