= SirReal2 =

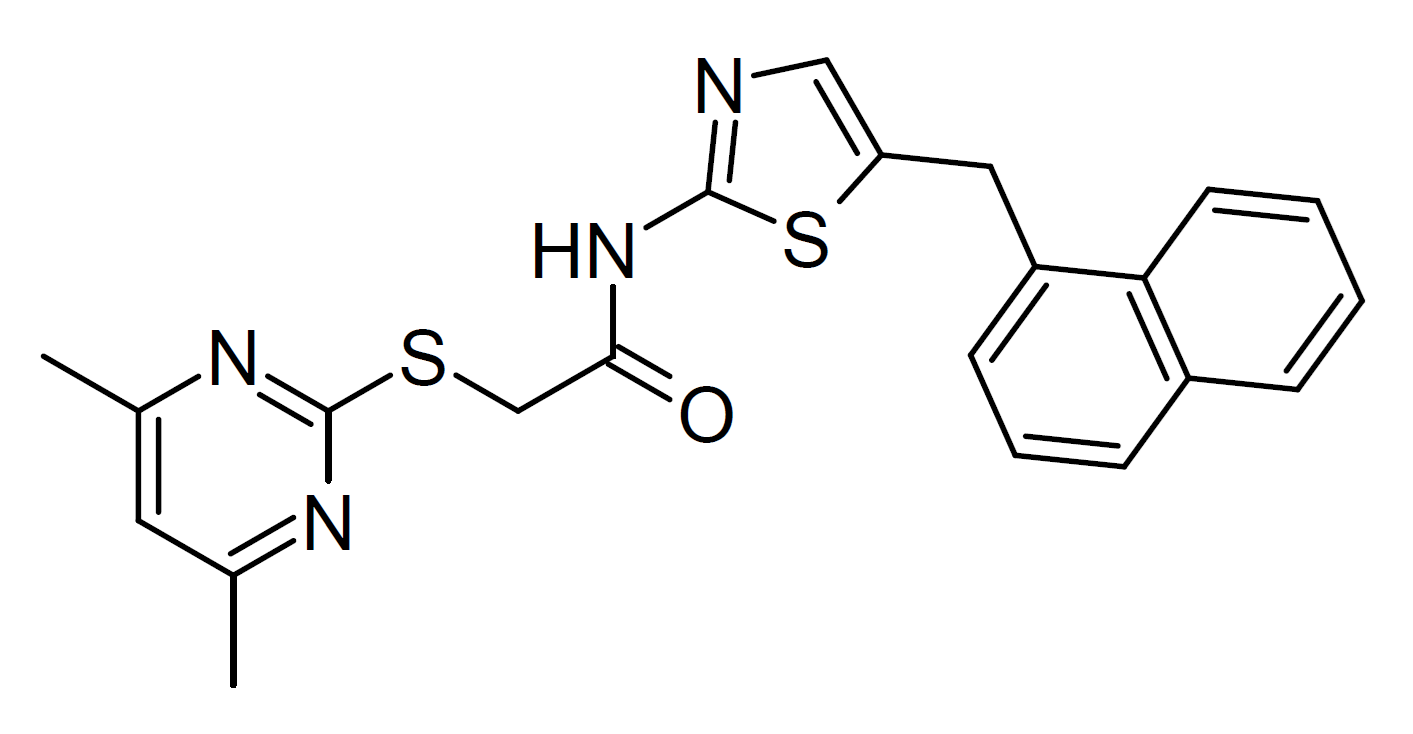

Clinical data
- Drug class: Sirtuin 2 (SIRT2) inhibitor

Identifiers
- IUPAC name: 2-(4,6-dimethylpyrimidin-2-yl)sulfanyl-N-[5-(naphthalen-1-ylmethyl)-1,3-thiazol-2-yl]acetamide
- CAS Number: 709002-46-0
- PubChem CID: 1096292
- ChemSpider: 934777
- ChEMBL: ChEMBL3770903

Chemical and physical data
- Formula: C_{22}H_{20}N_{4}OS_{2}
- Molar mass: 420.55 g·mol^{−1}
- 3D model (JSmol): Interactive image
- SMILES: CC1=CC(=NC(=N1)SCC(=O)NC2=NC=C(S2)CC3=CC=CC4=CC=CC=C43)C
- InChI: InChI=1S/C22H20N4OS2/c1-14-10-15(2)25-22(24-14)28-13-20(27)26-21-23-12-18(29-21)11-17-8-5-7-16-6-3-4-9-19(16)17/h3-10,12H,11,13H2,1-2H3,(H,23,26,27); Key:MENNDDDTIIZDDN-UHFFFAOYSA-N

SirReal2 is a drug which acts as a potent and selective sirtuin 2 (SIRT2) inhibitor. It inhibits SIRT2 with an IC_{50} of 140nM, and is selective over SIRT1, SIRT3 and SIRT5. It is used in research into cancer, inflammation and neurodegenerative disorders such as Parkinson's disease, and has led to the discovery of a number of related derivatives.
