= Sirtuin 3 =

Protein found in humans

SIRT3
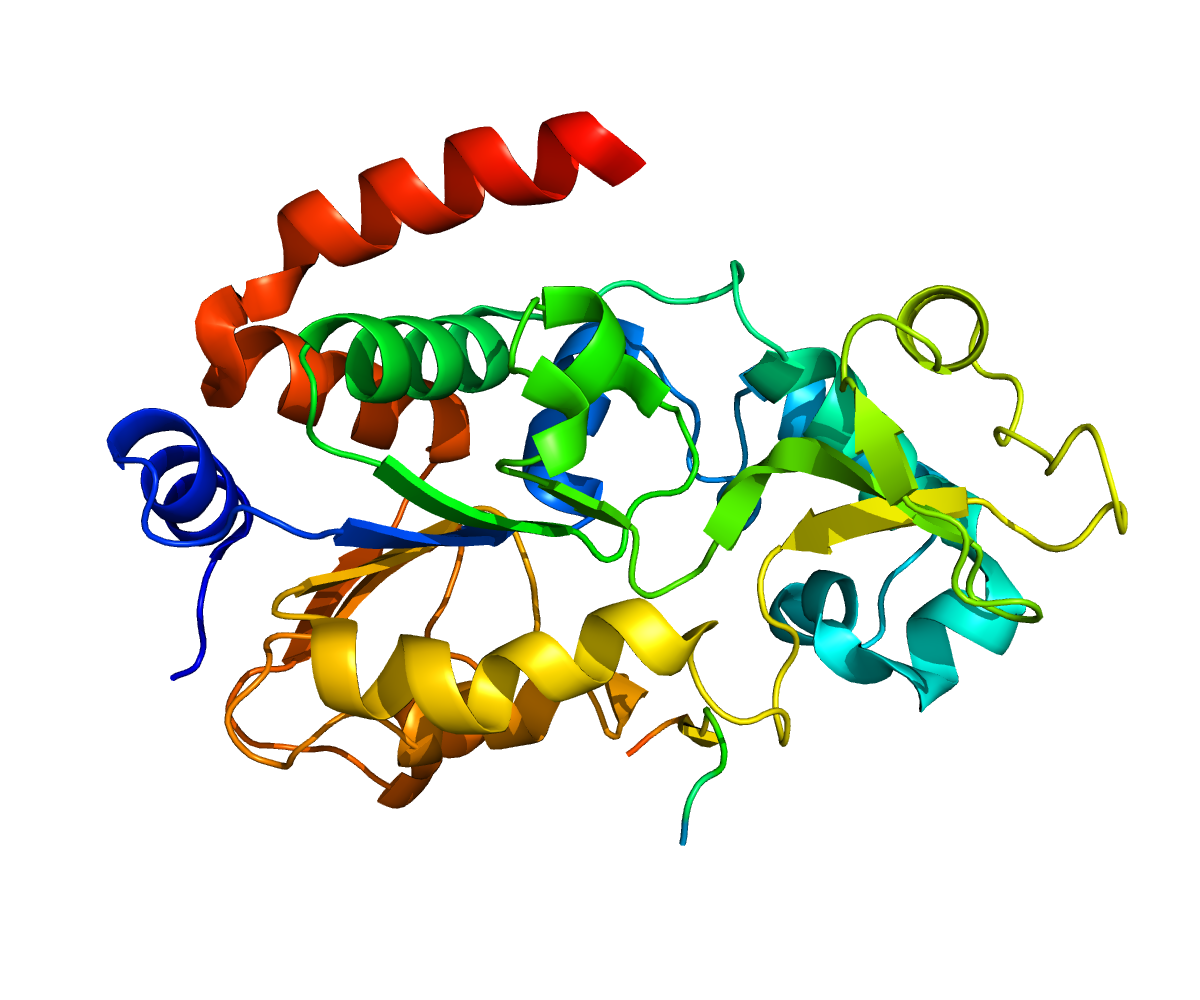

Identifiers
- Aliases: SIRT3, SIR2L3, sirtuin 3
- External IDs: OMIM: 604481; MGI: 1927665; GeneCards: SIRT3
Available structures
PDB	Ortholog search: PDBe RCSB
PDB	List of PDB id codes 3GLR, 3GLS, 3GLU, 4BN4, 4BN5, 4BV3, 4BVB, 4BVE, 4BVF, 4BVG, 4BVH, 4C78, 4C7B, 4FVT, 4FZ3, 4HD8, 4JSR, 4JT8, 4JT9, 4O8Z, 4V1C, 5D7N, 5BWN, 5BWO
Enzyme activity
EC #	BRENDA	ExPASy	KEGG	MetaCyc
2.3.1.286	↗	↗	↗	↗

Gene location (Human)
Chr.	Chromosome 11 (human)
Band	11p15.5	Start	215,030 bp
Band	11p15.5	End	236,931 bp

Gene location (Mouse)
Chr.	Chromosome 7 (mouse)
Band	7|7 F4- F5	Start	140,443,579 bp
Band	7|7 F4- F5	End	140,462,222 bp
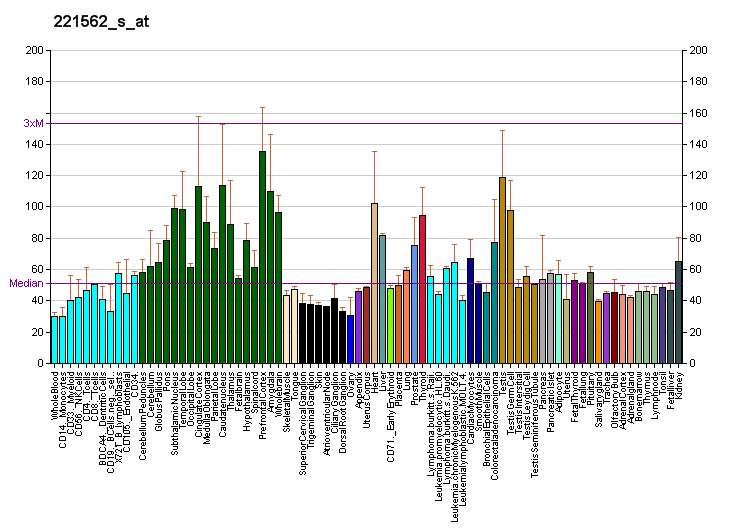

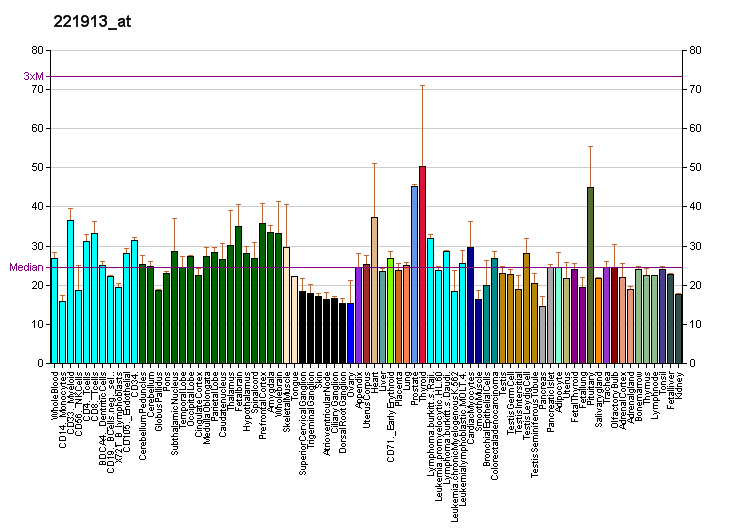

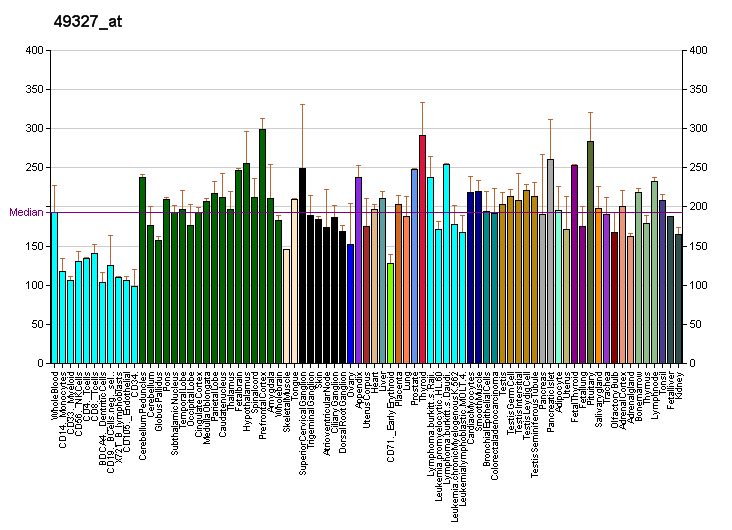
RNA expression pattern
Bgee	Human / Mouse (ortholog); Top expressed in: right frontal lobe; apex of heart; left testis; right testis; right uterine tube; right lobe of liver; nucleus accumbens; caudate nucleus; anterior pituitary; Brodmann area 9 / Top expressed in: proximal tubule; right kidney; left lobe of liver; facial motor nucleus; medial vestibular nucleus; dorsal tegmental nucleus; substantia nigra; medial geniculate nucleus; lateral geniculate nucleus; human kidney; More reference expression data
BioGPS	More reference expression data
Gene ontology
Molecular function	NAD+ ADP-ribosyltransferase activity; protein binding; hydrolase activity; NAD+ binding; metal ion binding; zinc ion binding; NAD-dependent histone deacetylase activity; NAD-dependent protein deacetylase activity; sequence-specific DNA binding; enzyme binding
Cellular component	mitochondrion; mitochondrial matrix; protein-containing complex; cytoplasm; nucleoplasm
Biological process	protein deacetylation; aerobic dissimilation; mitochondrion organization; peptidyl-lysine deacetylation; protein ADP-ribosylation; negative regulation of ERK1 and ERK2 cascade; positive regulation of insulin secretion; negative regulation of reactive oxygen species metabolic process; ageing; histone deacetylation
Sources:Amigo / QuickGO
Orthologs
Databases	NCBI: entry; OMA: entry
Species	Human	Mouse
Entrez	23410	64384
Ensembl	ENSG00000142082	ENSMUSG00000025486
UniProt	Q9NTG7	Q8R104
RefSeq (mRNA)	NM_001017524; NM_012239	NM_001127351; NM_001177804; NM_022433
RefSeq (protein)	NP_001017524; NP_036371; NP_001357239; NP_001357241; NP_001357243 NP_001357244; NP_001357245; NP_001357246; NP_001357247; NP_001357248; NP_001357249; NP_001357250; NP_001357251; NP_001357252; NP_001357253; NP_001357254	NP_001120823; NP_001171275; NP_071878
Location (UCSC)	Chr 11: 0.22 – 0.24 Mb	Chr 7: 140.44 – 140.46 Mb
PubMed search
- Wikidata
View/Edit Human	View/Edit Mouse

NAD-dependent deacetylase sirtuin-3, mitochondrial also known as SIRT3 is a protein that in humans is encoded by the SIRT3 gene. SIRT3 is member of the mammalian sirtuin family of proteins, which are homologs to the yeast Sir2 protein. SIRT3 exhibits NAD+-dependent deacetylase activity.

Members of the sirtuin family are characterized by a sirtuin core domain and grouped into four classes, and the protein encoded by this gene is included in class I of the sirtuin family. The human sirtuins have a range of molecular functions and have emerged as important proteins in aging, stress resistance, and metabolic regulation. Yeast sirtuin proteins are known to regulate epigenetic gene silencing and suppress recombination of rDNA. In addition to protein deacetylation, studies have shown that the human sirtuins may also function as intracellular regulatory proteins with mono ADP ribosyltransferase activity.

== Structure ==
SIRT3 is a soluble protein located in the mitochondrial matrix, and contains a mitochondrial processing peptide at the N-terminus. A set of crystal structures of human SIRT3 have been solved, including an apo-structure with no substrate, a structure with a peptide containing acetyl lysine of its natural substrate acetyl-CoA synthetase 2, a reaction intermediate structure trapped by a thioacetyl peptide, and a structure with the dethioacetylated peptide bond. These structures show the conformational changes induced by the two substrates required for the reaction, the acetylated substrate peptide and NAD^{+}. In addition, a binding study by isothermal titration calorimetry suggests that the acetylated peptide is the first substrate to bind to SIRT3, prior to NAD^{+}.

== Function ==
=== Mitochondrial ===
Three sirtuins, SIRT3, SIRT4 and SIRT5, are located in mitochondria and have been implicated in regulating metabolic processes. Endogenous SIRT3 is a soluble protein located in the mitochondrial matrix. Overexpression of SIRT3 in cultured cells increases respiration and decreases the production of reactive oxygen species. Fasting increases SIRT3 expression in white and brown adipose tissue (WAT and BAT, respectively) and overexpression of SIRT3 in HIB1B brown adipocytes increases the expression of PGC-1α and UCP1, suggesting a role for SIRT3 in adaptive thermogenesis BAT. BAT is different from WAT because it harbors large numbers of mitochondria and is important for thermogenesis in rodents. Thermogenesis in BAT is mediated by the uncoupling protein 1 (UCP1), which induces proton leakage and thereby generates heat instead of ATP. Mechanistic insights into how SIRT3 affects thermogenesis in BAT is lacking and whether SIRT3 affects UCP1 activity directly is not known.

In addition to controlling metabolism at the transcriptional level, sirtuins also directly control the activity of metabolic enzymes. In Salmonella enterica, the bacterial sirtuin CobB regulates the activity of the enzyme acetyl-coenzyme A (acetyl-CoA) synthetase. As mentioned above, orthologs of acetyl-CoA synthetase exist in the cytoplasm (AceCS1) and in mitochondria (AceCS2) in mammals. The presence of the sirtuin deacetylase SIRT3 in the mitochondrial matrix suggests the existence of lysine acetylated mitochondrial proteins. Indeed, SIRT3 deacetylates and activates the mammalian mitochondrial acetyl-coA synthetase (AceCS2). Furthermore, SIRT3 and AceCS2 are found complexed with one another, suggesting a critical role for control of AceCS2 activity by SIRT3.

Activation of the NMNAT2 enzyme, which catalyze an essential step in the nicotinamide adenine dinucleotide (NAD+) biosynthetic pathway by SIRT3 may be a means of inhibiting axon degeneration and dysfunction.

=== Nuclear ===
In addition to its reported mitochondrial function, some researchers have proposed a very small pool of active nuclear SIRT3 exists. This pool is reported to consist of the long form of SIRT3 and has been suggested to have histone deacetylase activity. The observation that SIRT3 has nuclear activity came from a report that SIRT3 protected cardiomyocytes from stress mediated cell death and that this effect was due to deacetylation of a nuclear factor, Ku-70.

== Clinical significance ==
=== Aging ===
There is a strong association between SIRT3 alleles and longevity in males.

Activation of SIRT3 inhibits the apoptosis leading to age-related macular degeneration. SIRT3 induced mitophagy, inhibiting cell death, and thus could be used to treat neurodegenerative diseases.

=== Carcinogenesis ===
There is a significant body of published literature suggesting a strong mechanistic link between mitochondrial function, aging, and carcinogenesis. SIRT3 inhibits cancers that depend upon glycolysis, but promotes cancers that depend upon oxidative phosphorylation.

Sirt3 functions as a mitochondrial tumor suppressor protein. Although some evidence attributes SIRT3 activity in bypassing growth arrest in bladder carcinoma cells via regulation of p53 in the mitochondria. Damaged and aberrant mitochondrial function, similar to gene mutations, may be an early event that ultimately leads to the development of cancers. Mice genetically altered to delete Sirt3 develop estrogen and progesterone receptor (ER/PR) positive breast mammary tumors. In tumor samples from women with breast cancer, SIRT3 expression was decreased, as compared to normal breast tissues. Thus, the Sirt3 knockout model may be used to investigate ER/PR positive breast tumor development.

== Ligands ==
=== Activators ===
- 2-APQC
- 5-Heptadecylresorcinol
- ADTL-SA1215
- Brazilin
- Ganoderic acid D (108340-60-9)
- Honokiol
- Pterostilbene
- Resveratrol
- Rhynchophylline
- SKLB-11A
- SIRT3 activator 2 (compound 2a)
- SZC-6

=== Inhibitors ===
- 4-Bromoresveratrol
- YC8-02 (mixed SIRT2 / SIRT3 inhibitor)
