= FLS-359 =

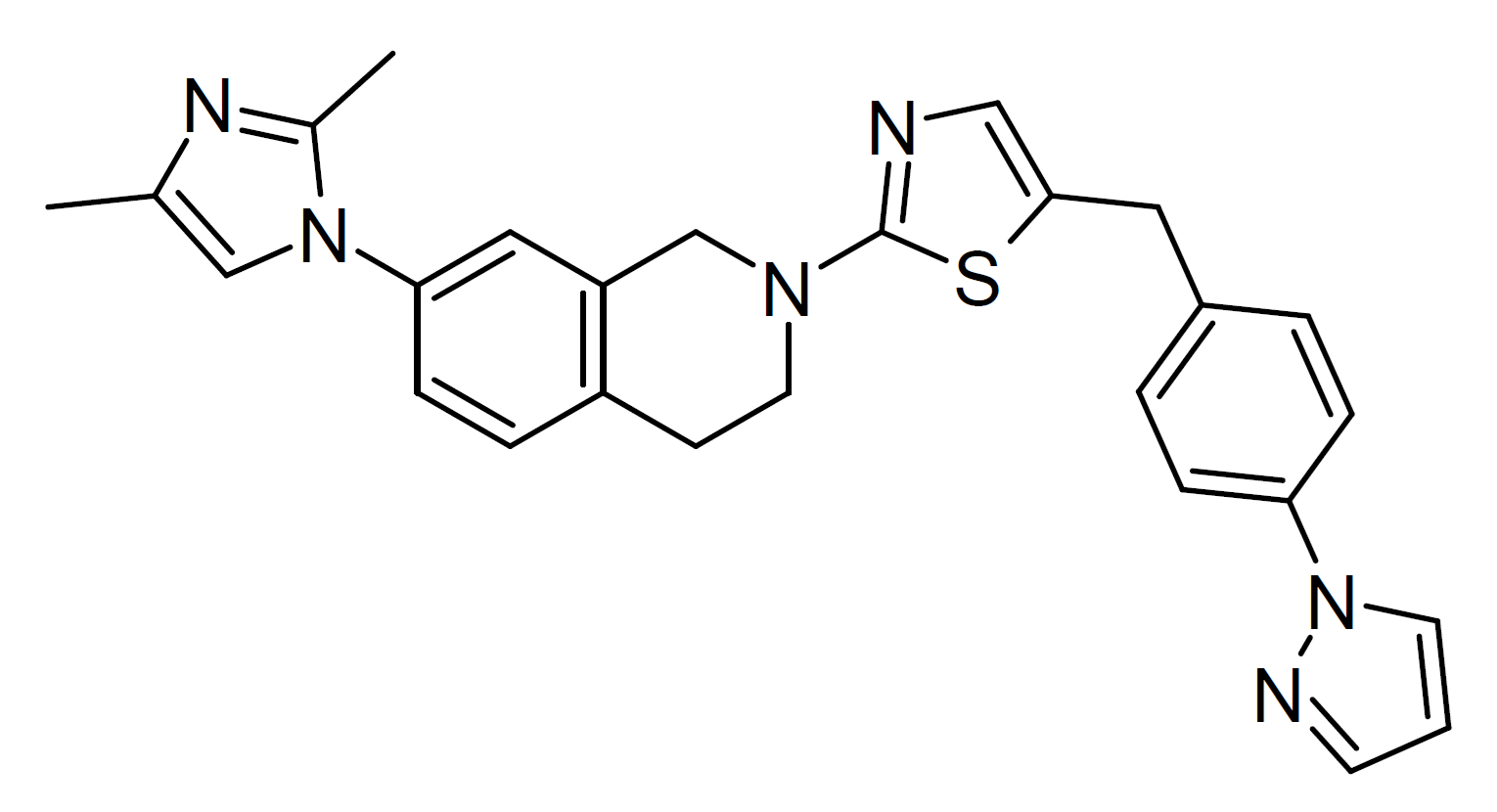

Clinical data
- Drug class: Sirtuin 2 (SIRT2) inhibitor

Identifiers
- IUPAC name: 2-[7-(2,4-dimethylimidazol-1-yl)-3,4-dihydro-1H-isoquinolin-2-yl]-5-[(4-pyrazol-1-ylphenyl)methyl]-1,3-thiazole
- CAS Number: 2309398-79-4
- PubChem CID: 138571253
- ChemSpider: 129601602
- ChEMBL: ChEMBL6065272

Chemical and physical data
- Formula: C_{27}H_{26}N_{6}S
- Molar mass: 466.61 g·mol^{−1}
- 3D model (JSmol): Interactive image
- SMILES: CC1=CN(C(=N1)C)C2=CC3=C(CCN(C3)C4=NC=C(S4)CC5=CC=C(C=C5)N6C=CC=N6)C=C2
- InChI: InChI=1S/C27H26N6S/c1-19-17-32(20(2)30-19)25-9-6-22-10-13-31(18-23(22)15-25)27-28-16-26(34-27)14-21-4-7-24(8-5-21)33-12-3-11-29-33/h3-9,11-12,15-17H,10,13-14,18H2,1-2H3; Key:JRPPFSVORXBCPF-UHFFFAOYSA-N

FLS-359 is a drug which acts as a selective allosteric inhibitor of the enzyme sirtuin 2 (SIRT2). It has moderate potency, inhibiting SIRT2 with an IC_{50} of 3 μM, and shows broad-spectrum antiviral effects against both RNA and DNA viruses including hepatitis B and cytomegalovirus.
