= SRT-1460 =

Chemical compound

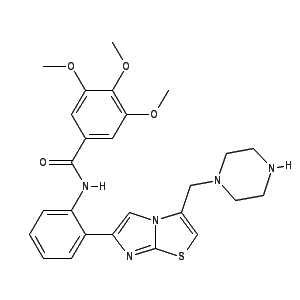

Identifiers
- IUPAC name: 3,4,5-trimethoxy-N-{2-[3-(piperazin-1-ylmethyl)imidazo[2,1-b][1,3]thiazol-6-yl]phenyl}benzamide
- CAS Number: 925432-73-1
- PubChem CID: 24180124
- ChemSpider: 23315250
- UNII: FN6D3F3HTG
- CompTox Dashboard (EPA): DTXSID40636044

Chemical and physical data
- Formula: C_{26}H_{29}N_{5}O_{4}S
- Molar mass: 507.61 g·mol^{−1}
- 3D model (JSmol): Interactive image
- SMILES: COc1cc(cc(c1OC)OC)C(=O)Nc2ccccc2c3cn4c(csc4n3)CN5CCNCC5

SRT-1460 is a drug in development by Sirtris Pharmaceuticals intended as a small-molecule activator of the sirtuin subtype SIRT1. It has similar activity in animal studies to the known SIRT1 activator resveratrol, but is closer in potency to SRT-1720. In animal studies it was found to improve insulin sensitivity and lower plasma glucose levels in fat, muscle and liver tissue, and increased mitochondrial and metabolic function. However, the claim that SRT1460 is a SIRT1 activator has been questioned and further defended.

== See also ==
- SRT-2183
- STAC-9
