= 5-Heptadecylresorcinol =

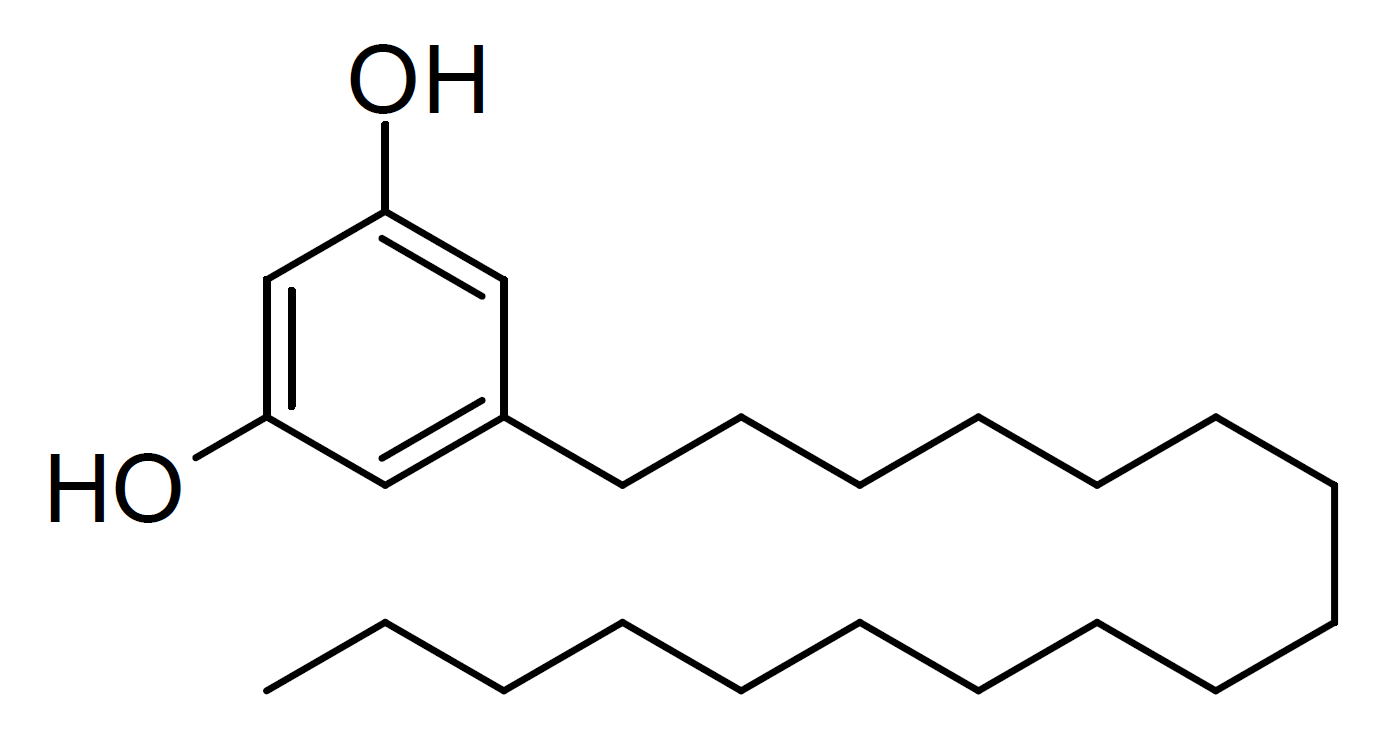

Clinical data
- Drug class: Sirtuin-3 (SIRT3) activator

Identifiers
- IUPAC name: 5-heptadecylbenzene-1,3-diol
- CAS Number: 41442-57-3
- PubChem CID: 181700
- ChemSpider: 158044
- UNII: MXE8ZPJ5XE
- ChEBI: CHEBI:145967
- ChEMBL: ChEMBL497530
- CompTox Dashboard (EPA): DTXSID50920522
- ECHA InfoCard: 100.190.309

Chemical and physical data
- Formula: C_{23}H_{40}O_{2}
- Molar mass: 348.571 g·mol^{−1}
- 3D model (JSmol): Interactive image
- SMILES: CCCCCCCCCCCCCCCCCC1=CC(=CC(=C1)O)O
- InChI: InChI=1S/C23H40O2/c1-2-3-4-5-6-7-8-9-10-11-12-13-14-15-16-17-21-18-22(24)20-23(25)19-21/h18-20,24-25H,2-17H2,1H3; Key:BBGNINPPDHJETF-UHFFFAOYSA-N

5-Heptadecylresorcinol (AR-C17) is a natural product which is found in whole grain wheat and rye along with related alkylresorcinols, but since it is a component of the bran it is not found in processed products such as white flour and white bread. It acts as an activator of the enzyme SIRT3, and has been linked to various health benefits, acting as an antiinflammatory and reducing symptoms of various aging-related conditions in animal studies such as cognitive impairment, atherosclerosis obesity, and non-alcoholic fatty liver disease.
