= AGK2 (SIRT2 inhibitor) =

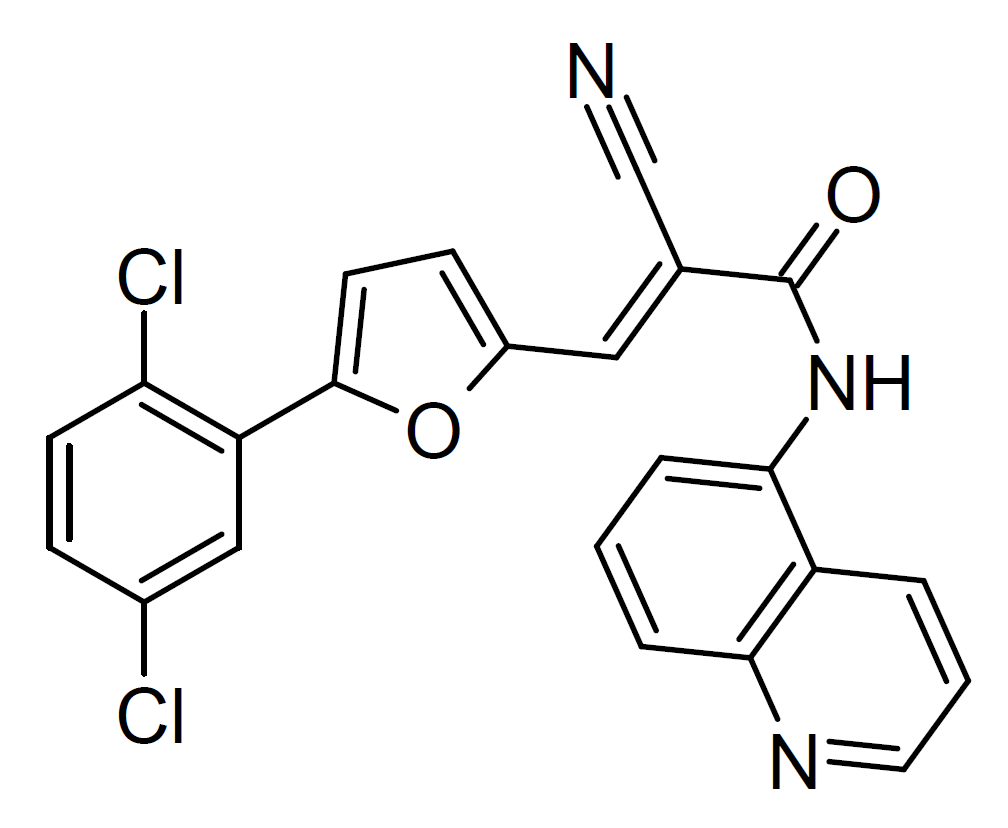

Clinical data
- Drug class: Sirtuin 2 (SIRT2) inhibitor

Identifiers
- IUPAC name: (E)-2-cyano-3-[5-(2,5-dichlorophenyl)furan-2-yl]-N-quinolin-5-ylprop-2-enamide
- CAS Number: 304896-28-4
- PubChem CID: 2130404
- IUPHAR/BPS: 8099
- ChemSpider: 1596332
- UNII: DDF0L8606A
- ChEBI: CHEBI:94578
- ChEMBL: ChEMBL224864
- CompTox Dashboard (EPA): DTXSID80184559
- ECHA InfoCard: 100.164.349

Chemical and physical data
- Formula: C_{23}H_{13}Cl_{2}N_{3}O_{2}
- Molar mass: 434.28 g·mol^{−1}
- 3D model (JSmol): Interactive image
- SMILES: C1=CC2=C(C=CC=N2)C(=C1)NC(=O)/C(=C/C3=CC=C(O3)C4=C(C=CC(=C4)Cl)Cl)/C#N
- InChI: InChI=1S/C23H13Cl2N3O2/c24-15-6-8-19(25)18(12-15)22-9-7-16(30-22)11-14(13-26)23(29)28-21-5-1-4-20-17(21)3-2-10-27-20/h1-12H,(H,28,29)/b14-11+; Key:SVENPFFEMUOOGK-SDNWHVSQSA-N

AGK2 is a drug which acts as a selective sirtuin 2 (SIRT2) inhibitor. It was one of the first selective SIRT2 inhibitors developed, and inhibits SIRT2 with an IC_{50} of 3.5μM, making it less potent than other more recently developed compounds, but it is still widely used in research. It has good selectivity for SIRT2 over SIRT1 and SIRT3, though its activity at other subtypes is less well characterised. It has antiviral effects, and has been used to study the potential role of SIRT2 inhibitors for the treatment of Parkinson’s disease as well cardiac fibrosis, and some forms of cancer.
