= Selisistat =

Identifiers
- IUPAC name: 6-chloro-2,3,4,9-tetrahydro-1H-carbazole-1-carboxamide
- CAS Number: 49843-98-3
- PubChem CID: 5113032
- IUPHAR/BPS: 8100
- DrugBank: DB13978
- ChemSpider: 4288080
- UNII: L19ECD5014
- ChEBI: CHEBI:90369
- ChEMBL: ChEMBL420311
- CompTox Dashboard (EPA): 10964442
- ECHA InfoCard: 100.190.284

Chemical and physical data
- Formula: C_{13}H_{13}ClN_{2}O
- Molar mass: 248.71 g·mol^{−1}
- 3D model (JSmol): Interactive image
- SMILES: C1CC(C2=C(C1)C3=C(N2)C=CC(=C3)Cl)C(=O)N
- InChI: InChI=1S/C13H13ClN2O/c14-7-4-5-11-10(6-7)8-2-1-3-9(13(15)17)12(8)16-11/h4-6,9,16H,1-3H2,(H2,15,17); Key:FUZYTVDVLBBXDL-UHFFFAOYSA-N

Selisistat (EX-527) is an experimental drug which is a potent and selective inhibitor of the SIRT1 protein. It was developed as a potential agent for the treatment of Huntington's disease, but also has potential applications in cancer treatment.
