= SRT-2183 =

Organic compound, experimental pharmaceuticum

Clinical data
- ATC code: None

Legal status
- Legal status: Investigational

Identifiers
- IUPAC name: N-[2-(3-{[(3R)-3-hydroxypyrrolidin-1-yl]methyl}imidazo[2,1-b][1,3]thiazol-6-yl)phenyl]naphthalene-2-carboxamide
- CAS Number: 1001908-89-9
- PubChem CID: 24180126
- ChemSpider: 23315224
- UNII: 6FKU9G9CX6
- ChEMBL: ChEMBL403308
- CompTox Dashboard (EPA): DTXSID501029656

Chemical and physical data
- Formula: C_{27}H_{24}N_{4}O_{2}S
- Molar mass: 468.58 g·mol^{−1}
- 3D model (JSmol): Interactive image
- SMILES: c1ccc2cc(ccc2c1)C(=O)Nc3ccccc3c4cn5c(csc5n4)CN6CC[C@H](C6)O
- InChI: InChI=1S/C27H24N4O2S/c32-22-11-12-30(15-22)14-21-17-34-27-29-25(16-31(21)27)23-7-3-4-8-24(23)28-26(33)20-10-9-18-5-1-2-6-19(18)13-20/h1-10,13,16-17,22,32H,11-12,14-15H2,(H,28,33)/t22-/m1/s1; Key:MUFSINOSQBMSLE-JOCHJYFZSA-N

SRT-2183 is a drug in development by Sirtris Pharmaceuticals intended as a small-molecule activator of the sirtuin subtype SIRT1. It has similar activity in animal studies to another SIRT1 activator SRT-1720, but is closer in potency to resveratrol. In animal studies it was found to improve insulin sensitivity and lower plasma glucose levels in fat, muscle and liver tissue, and increased mitochondrial and metabolic function. However, the claim that SRT-2183 is a SIRT1 activator has been questioned and further defended.

== See also ==
- SRT-1460
