= 2-APQC =

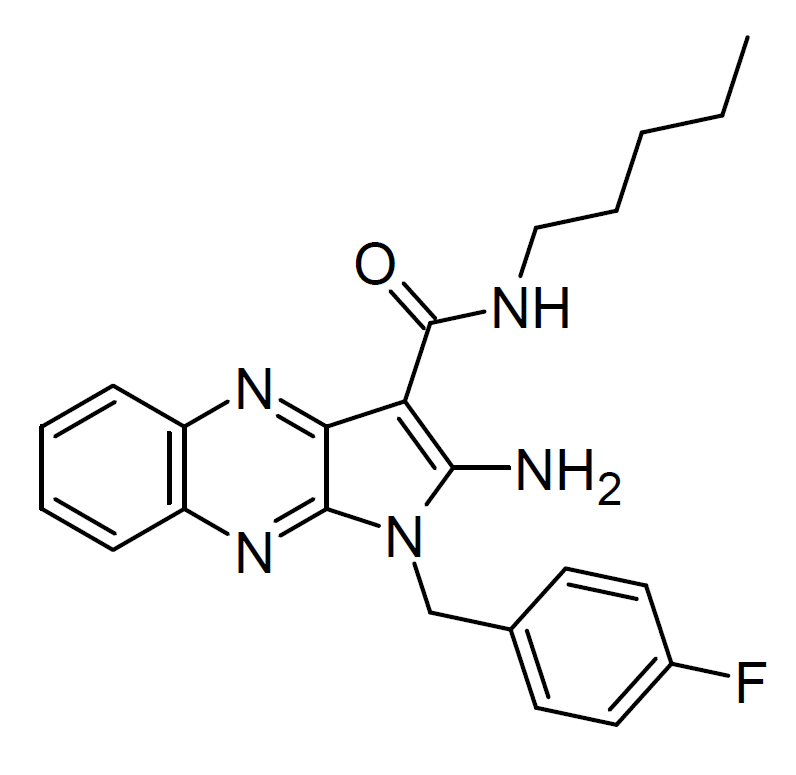

Clinical data
- Drug class: Sirtuin-3 (SIRT3) activator

Identifiers
- IUPAC name: 2-amino-1-[(4-fluorophenyl)methyl]-N-pentylpyrrolo[3,2-b]quinoxaline-3-carboxamide
- CAS Number: 500271-63-6
- PubChem CID: 1965265
- ChemSpider: 1499078

Chemical and physical data
- Formula: C_{23}H_{24}FN_{5}O
- Molar mass: 405.477 g·mol^{−1}
- 3D model (JSmol): Interactive image
- SMILES: CCCCCNC(=O)C1=C(N(C2=NC3=CC=CC=C3N=C12)CC4=CC=C(C=C4)F)N
- InChI: InChI=1S/C23H24FN5O/c1-2-3-6-13-26-23(30)19-20-22(28-18-8-5-4-7-17(18)27-20)29(21(19)25)14-15-9-11-16(24)12-10-15/h4-5,7-12H,2-3,6,13-14,25H2,1H3,(H,26,30); Key:FYNPHMNXVLLDAS-UHFFFAOYSA-N

2-APQC is a drug which acts as a sirtuin-3 (SIRT3) activator. In animal studies, it improved muscle and heart function in aged mice.
