= MIR34A =

Non-coding RNA in humans

Identifiers
- Aliases: MIR34A, MIRN34A, miRNA34A, mir-34, mir-34a, microRNA 34a, MIRN34 microRNA, human
- External IDs: OMIM: 611172; GeneCards: MIR34A

Gene location (Human)
Chr.	Chromosome 1 (human)
Band	1p36.22|1p36.22	Start	9,151,668 bp
Band	1p36.22|1p36.22	End	9,151,777 bp
RNA expression pattern
Bgee	Human / Mouse (ortholog); Top expressed in: liver; gastrocnemius muscle; left adrenal gland; transverse colon; left lobe of thyroid gland; subcutaneous adipose tissue; right auricle of heart; vagina; body of pancreas; right hemisphere of cerebellum / n/a; More reference expression data
BioGPS	n/a
Orthologs
Databases	NCBI: entry; OMA: entry
Species	Human	Mouse
Entrez	407040	n/a
Ensembl	ENSG00000284357	n/a
UniProt	n a	n/a
RefSeq (mRNA)	n/a	n/a
RefSeq (protein)	n/a	n/a
Location (UCSC)	Chr 1: 9.15 – 9.15 Mb	n/a
PubMed search		n/a
- Wikidata
View/Edit Human

MicroRNA 34a (miR-34a) is a microRNA that in humans is encoded by the MIR34A gene.

== Function ==
microRNAs (miRNAs) are short (20–24 nt) non-coding RNAs that are involved in post-transcriptional regulation of gene expression in multicellular organisms by affecting both the stability and translation of mRNAs. miRNAs are transcribed by RNA polymerase II as part of capped and polyadenylated primary transcripts (pri-miRNAs) that can be either protein-coding or non-coding.

The primary transcript is cleaved by the Drosha ribonuclease III enzyme to produce an approximately 70-nt stem-loop precursor miRNA (pre-miRNA), which is further cleaved by the cytoplasmic Dicer ribonuclease to generate the mature miRNA and antisense miRNA star (miRNA*) products.

The mature miRNA is incorporated into a RNA-induced silencing complex (RISC), which recognizes target mRNAs through imperfect base pairing with the miRNA and most commonly results in translational inhibition or destabilization of the target mRNA. The RefSeq represents the predicted microRNA stem-loop.

=== Repair of DNA damage ===
Expression of miR-34A is markedly up-regulated in hematopoietic stem cells (HSCs) from mice subjected to ionizing radiation. HSCs that are deficient in miR-34A have decreased expression of genes involved in the DNA repair processes of homologous recombination and non-homologous end joining. These and other findings demonstrate that miR-34A contributes to the survival of HSCs after irradiation.

== Clinical relevance ==
miR-34a suppresses the gene expression of NAMPT, which encodes nicotinamide phosphoribosyltransferase (NAMPT), the rate-limiting enzyme in the nicotinamide adenine dinucleotide (NAD) salvage pathway, resulting in reduced levels of NAD. miR-34a suppression of NAMPT gene expression also reduces levels of sirtuin 1. Aging and obesity increase levels of miR-34a. The pro-inflammatory transcription factor NF-κB (increasingly expressed with obesity and aging) increases miR-34a expression by binding to its promoter region. Inhibition of miR-34a in diet-induced obese mice restored levels of NAMPT and NAD, reducing inflammation and improving glucose tolerance.

miR-34a represses the translation of sirtuin 1 (SIRT1) in liver by binding to the 3′-UTR region of SIRT1 messenger RNA, contributing to metabolic syndrome. Downregulation of SIRT1 by miR-34a promotes cellular senescence and inflammation in vascular smooth muscle cells of old mice, similar to reduced SIRT1 in vascular smooth muscle cells in humans. Impaired endothelial-dependent vasorelaxation caused by miR-34a can be ameliorated by SIRT1 overexpression.
