= SZC-6 =

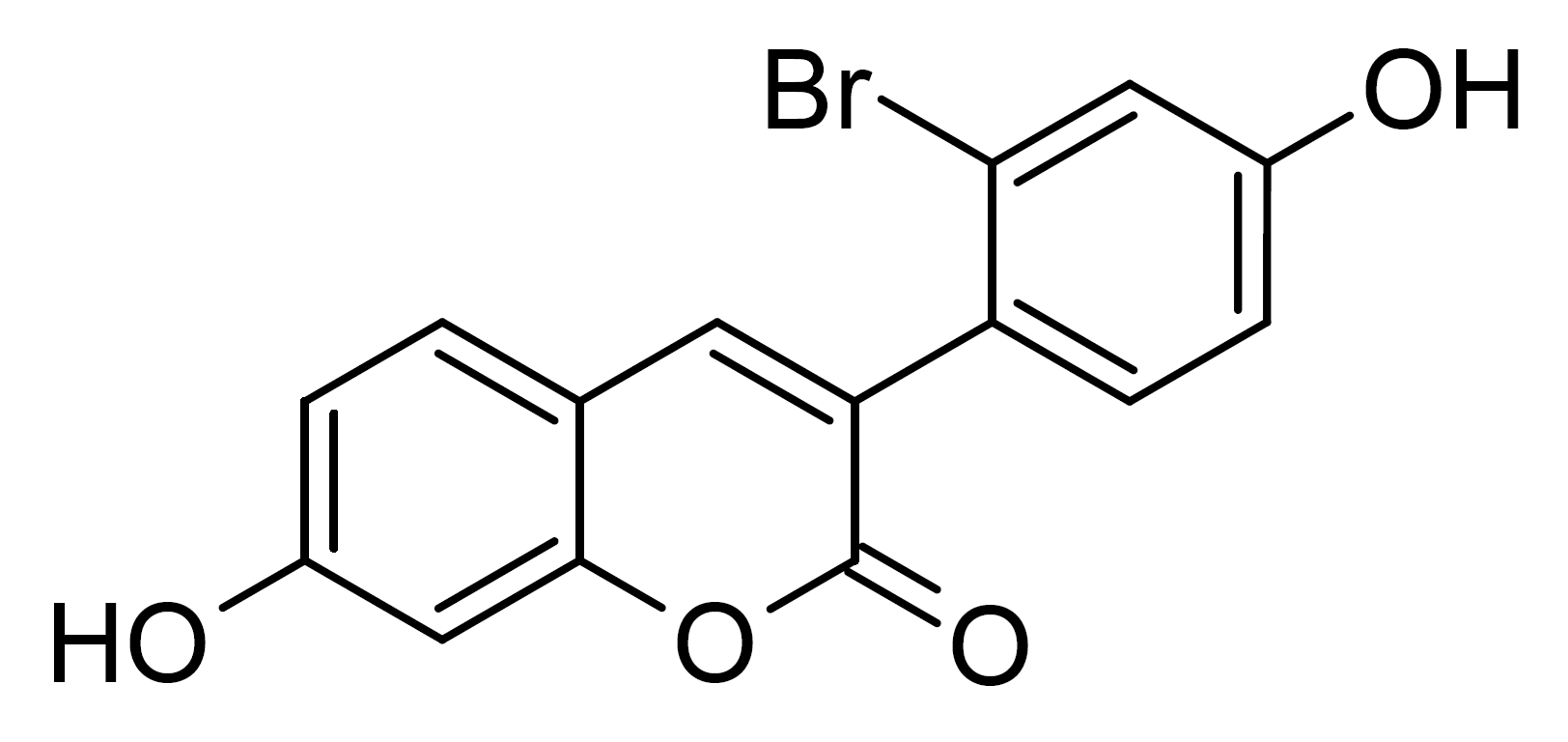

Clinical data
- Drug class: Sirtuin-3 (SIRT3) activator

Identifiers
- IUPAC name: 3-(2-bromo-4-hydroxyphenyl)-7-hydroxychromen-2-one
- CAS Number: 2010938-41-5
- PubChem CID: 141475102
- ChemSpider: 129973363

Chemical and physical data
- Formula: C_{15}H_{9}BrO_{4}
- Molar mass: 333.137 g·mol^{−1}
- 3D model (JSmol): Interactive image
- SMILES: C1=CC2=C(C=C1O)OC(=O)C(=C2)C3=C(C=C(C=C3)O)Br
- InChI: InChI=1S/C15H9BrO4/c16-13-6-9(17)3-4-11(13)12-5-8-1-2-10(18)7-14(8)20-15(12)19/h1-7,17-18H; Key:FKXHOWSOYGZBRG-UHFFFAOYSA-N

SZC-6 is a drug from the coumarin family which acts as a sirtuin-3 (SIRT3) activator. It has been used in animal studies to study the potential role of SIRT3 activators in the treatment of complications arising from diabetes.
