= TUG-UBL1 protein domain =

TUG
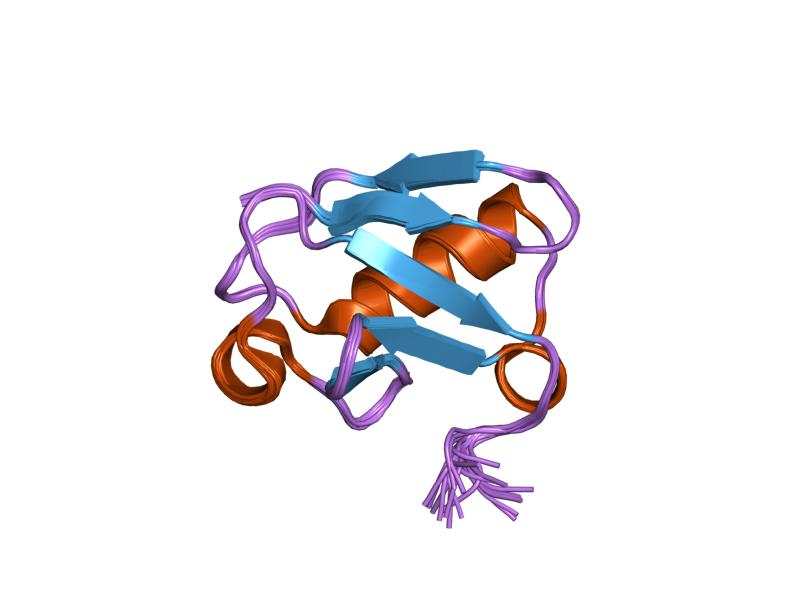
- solution structure and backbone dynamics of an n-terminal ubiquitin-like domain in the glut4-tethering protein, tug

Identifiers
- Symbol: TUG
- Pfam: PF11470
- Pfam clan: CL0072
- InterPro: IPR021569
Available protein structures:
- PDB: IPR021569 PF11470 (ECOD; PDBsum)
- AlphaFold: IPR021569; PF11470

In molecular biology, TUG-UBL1 refers to a protein that regulates a glucose transporter called GLUT4. TUG-UBL1 is an acronym for Tether containing UBX domain for GLUT4-Ubiquitin Like 1, this is encoded for by the gene, ASPSCR1.

== Function ==
When insulin is secreted, glucose uptake of cells increase, since insulin stimulates GLUT4 to move from the intracellular surface to the outer surface. In a similar fashion, TUG retains GLUT4 within unstimulated cells, but when insulin is secreted it causes GLUT4 to dissociate and so GLUT4 moves to the cell surface. TUG binds directly and specifically to a large intracellular loop in GLUT4. It acts as a tethering protein, which along with other proteins, retain GLUT4 within cells in the absence of insulin. Additionally, when the protein TUG becomes disrupted it appears to accelerate the degradation of GLUT4 in lysosomes. However, the functional role of the TUG–UBL1 domain remains to be elucidated.

== Structure ==
N-terminal ubiquitin-like domain (TUG–UBL1) has a tertiary structure of TUG–UBL1, which consists of a beta-grasp or ubiquitin-like topology for this domain. This comprises a five-stranded beta-sheet, a single major alpha-helix (residues 32–42), and two short helices.

== Mechanism ==
TUG releases the GLUT4 containing vesicles (GSVs) in response to insulin stimulation which allows it to move to the plasma membrane. TUG has an N-terminal ubiquitin-like protein domain (UBL1) which in similar proteins appears to participate in protein-protein interactions. The region does have an area of negative electrostatic potential and increased backbone motility which leads to suggestions of a potential protein-protein interaction site.
