= Nucleoside ribosyltransferase =

Class of enzymes

nucleoside ribosyltransferase

Identifiers
- EC no.: 2.4.2.5
- CAS no.: 9030-31-3

Databases
- IntEnz: IntEnz view
- BRENDA: BRENDA entry
- ExPASy: NiceZyme view
- KEGG: KEGG entry
- MetaCyc: metabolic pathway
- PRIAM: profile
- PDB structures: RCSB PDB PDBe PDBsum
- Gene Ontology: AmiGO / QuickGO
Search
- PMC: articles
- PubMed: articles
- NCBI: proteins

In enzymology, a nucleoside ribosyltransferase (EC 2.4.2.5) is an enzyme that catalyzes the chemical reaction

D-ribosyl-base_{1} + base_{2} $\rightleftharpoons$ D-ribosyl-base_{2} + base_{1}

Thus, the two substrates of this enzyme are D-ribosyl-base_{1} and base_{2}, whereas its two products are D-ribosyl-base_{2} and base_{1}.

This enzyme belongs to the family of glycosyltransferases, specifically the pentosyltransferases. The systematic name of this enzyme class is nucleoside:purine(pyrimidine) D-ribosyltransferase. This enzyme is also called nucleoside N-ribosyltransferase.
