= SRT-1720 =

Organic compound, experimental pharmaceuticum

Identifiers
- IUPAC name: N-[2-[3-(piperazin-1-ylmethyl)imidazo[2,1-b][1,3]thiazol-6-yl]phenyl]quinoxaline-2-carboxamide
- CAS Number: 925434-55-5
- PubChem CID: 24180125
- IUPHAR/BPS: 7703
- ChemSpider: 20581461
- UNII: DX3FHY76FZ
- CompTox Dashboard (EPA): DTXSID00636045

Chemical and physical data
- Formula: C_{25}H_{23}N_{7}OS
- Molar mass: 469.57 g·mol^{−1}
- 3D model (JSmol): Interactive image
- SMILES: C6CNCCN6Cc(n1c5)csc1nc5-c3ccccc3NC(=O)c4cnc2ccccc2n4
- InChI: InChI=1S/C25H23N7OS/c33-24(22-13-27-20-7-3-4-8-21(20)28-22)29-19-6-2-1-5-18(19)23-15-32-17(16-34-25(32)30-23)14-31-11-9-26-10-12-31/h1-8,13,15-16,26H,9-12,14H2,(H,29,33); Key:IASPBORHOMBZMY-UHFFFAOYSA-N

SRT-1720 is an experimental drug that was studied by Sirtris Pharmaceuticals intended as a small-molecule activator of the sirtuin subtype SIRT1. The compound has been studied in animals, but safety and efficacy in humans have not been established.

== Animal research ==
In animal models of obesity and diabetes SRT1720 was found to improve insulin sensitivity and lower plasma glucose levels in fat, muscle and liver tissue, and increase mitochondrial and metabolic function. In mice rendered obese and diabetic by feeding a high-fat, high-sugar diet, a study performed at the National Institute of Aging found that feeding chow infused with the highest dose of SRT1720 beginning at one year of age increased mean lifespan by 18%, and maximum lifespan by 5%, as compared to other short-lived obese, diabetic mice; however, treated animals still lived substantially shorter lives than normal-weight mice fed normal chow with no drug. In a later study, SRT1720 increased mean lifespan of obese, diabetic mice by 21.7%, similar to the earlier study, but there was no effect on maximum lifespan in this study. In normal-weight mice fed a standard rodent diet, SRT1720 increased mean lifespan by just 8.8%, and again had no effect on maximum lifespan.

Since the discovery of SRT1720, the claim that this compound is a SIRT1 activator has been questioned and further defended.

Although SRT1720 is not currently undergoing clinical development, a related compound, SRT2104, reached Phase II human trials for metabolic diseases.

== See also ==
- SRT-647
- SRT-1460
- SRT-2183
- STAC-9
