= Sirtris Pharmaceuticals =

Biotechnology company in Massachusetts

Sirtris Pharmaceuticals, Inc. was a biotechnology company based in Cambridge, MA that developed therapies for type 2 diabetes, cancer, and other diseases. Conceived in 2004 by Harvard University biologist David Sinclair and Andrew Perlman, and founded that year by Sinclair and Perlman, along with Christoph Westphal, Richard Aldrich, Richard Pops, and Paul Schimmel, the company was focused on developing Sinclair's research into activators of sirtuins, work that began in the laboratory of Leonard P. Guarente where Sinclair worked as a post-doc before starting his own lab.

== Synopsis ==
The company was specifically focused on resveratrol formulations and derivatives as activators of the SIRT1 enzyme; Sinclair became known for making statements about resveratrol like: “(It's) as close to a miraculous molecule as you can find.... One hundred years from now, people will maybe be taking these molecules on a daily basis to prevent heart disease, stroke, and cancer.” Most of the anti-aging field was more cautious, especially with regard to what else resveratrol might do in the body and its lack of bioavailability. The company's initial product was called SRT501, and was a formulation of resveratrol.

Sirtris went public in 2007 and was subsequently purchased and made a subsidiary of GlaxoSmithKline in 2008 for $720 million. GSK paid $22.50/share, when Sirtris's stock was trading at $12/share, down 45% from its highest price of the previous year.

Studies published in 2009 and early 2010 by scientists from Amgen and Pfizer cast doubt on whether SIRT1 was directly activated by resveratrol and showed that the apparent activity was actually due to a fluorescent reagent used in the experiments.

In August 2010, a nonprofit called the Healthy Lifespan Institute, which had been formed the year before by Westphal and Michelle Dipp, who joined GSK from Sirtris, began selling SRT501 as a dietary supplement online; when this became public GSK required Westphal and Dipp, who were still GSK employees, to resign from the nonprofit.

GSK/Sirtris terminated development of SRT501 in late 2010. GSK said it was terminating SRT501 due to side effects of nausea, vomiting, and diarrhea it caused, and because the compound's activity wasn't specific to SIRT1, at some doses it actually inhibited SIRT1, and the compound itself wasn't patentable. The company said at that time that it was focused on two compounds called SRT2104 and SRT2379 that were not resveratrol analogs, had better drug-like qualities, and were more selective SIRT1 activators.

In 2013 GSK shut down Sirtris and its development candidates were absorbed into GSK, where research and development continued. At that time, GSK/Sirtris' lead candidate was SRT2104, described as a "first-generation sirtuin-activating compound."
