= Sirtuin-activating compound =

Chemical compounds having an effect on sirtuins

Sirtuin-activating compounds (STAC) are chemical compounds having an effect on sirtuins, a group of enzymes that use NAD+ to remove acetyl groups from proteins. They are caloric restriction mimetic compounds that may be helpful in treating various aging-related diseases.

== Context ==
Leonard P. Guarente is recognized as the leading proponent of the hypothesis that caloric restriction slows aging by activation of Sirtuins.

STACs have been discovered by Konrad Howitz of Biomol Inc and biologist David Sinclair. In September 2003, Howitz and Sinclair et al. published a highly cited paper reporting that polyphenols such as resveratrol activate human SIRT1 and extend the lifespan of budding yeast (Howitz et al., Nature, 2003). Other examples of such products are butein, piceatannol, isoliquiritigenin, fisetin, and quercetin.

Sirtuins depend on the crucial cellular molecule called nicotinamide adenine dinucleotide (NAD+) for their function. Falling NAD+ levels during aging may adversely impact sirtuin maintenance of DNA integrity and ability to combat oxidative stress-induced cell damage. Increasing cellular NAD+ levels with supplements like nicotinamide mononucleotide (NMN) during aging may slow or reverse certain aging processes with sirtuin function enhancement.

Some STACs can cause artificial effects in the assay initially used for their identification, but it has been shown that STACs also activate SIRT1 against regular polypeptide substrates, with an influence of the substrate sequence.

Sirtris Pharmaceuticals, Sinclair's company, was purchased by GlaxoSmithKline (GSK) in 2008, and subsequently shut down as a separate entity within GSK.

== See also ==
- Gerontology
- SRT1460
- SRT1720
