= Sirtuin 1 =

Protein

SIRT1
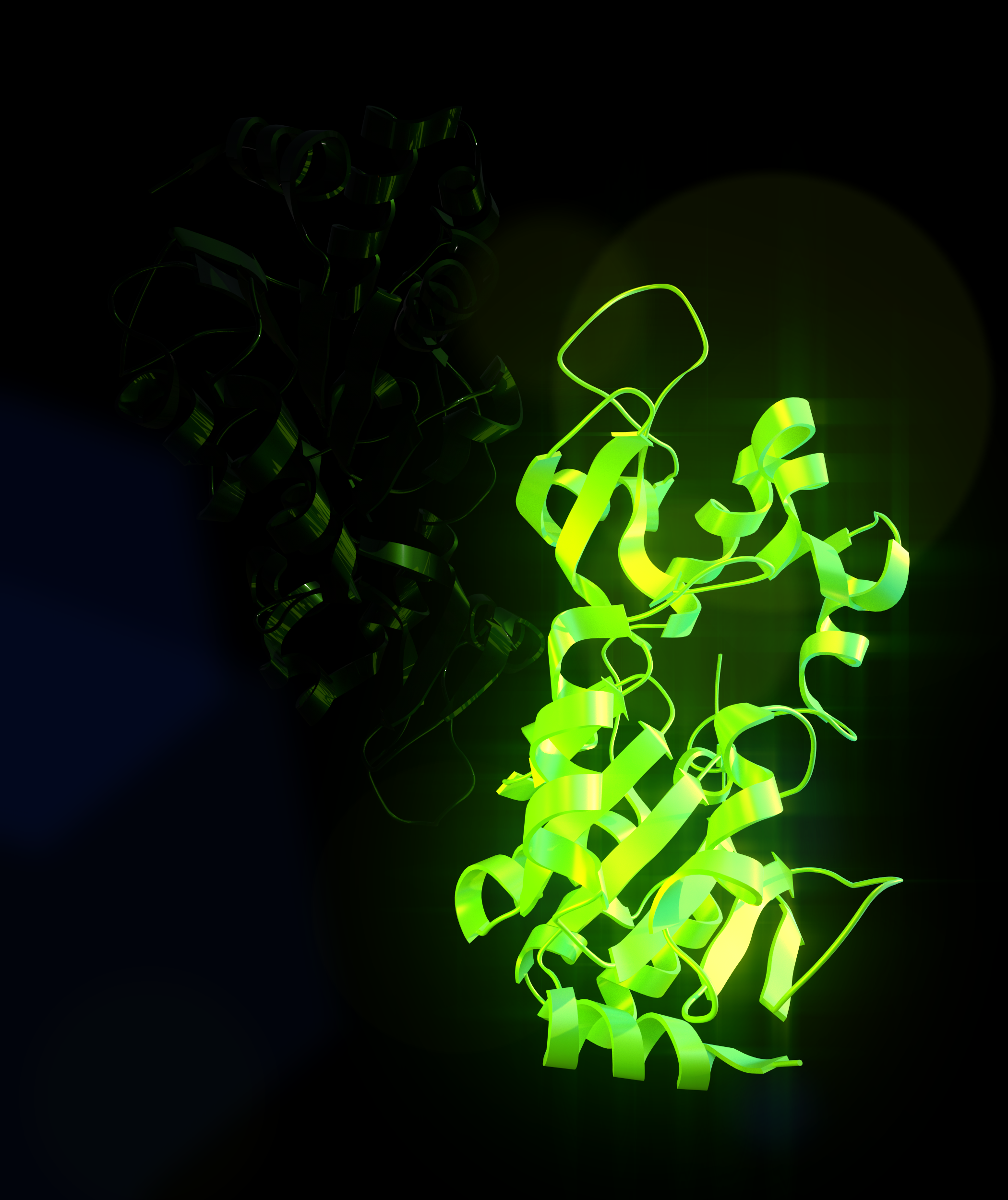

Identifiers
- Aliases: SIRT1, SIR2L1, SIR2, hSIR2, SIR2alpha, Sirtuin 1
- External IDs: OMIM: 604479; MGI: 2135607; GeneCards: SIRT1
Available structures
| PDB | Ortholog search: PDBe RCSB |
| PDB | List of PDB id codes 4I5I, 4IF6, 4IG9, 4KXQ, 4ZZH, 4ZZI, 4ZZJ, 5BTR |
Enzyme activity
| EC # | BRENDA | ExPASy | KEGG | MetaCyc |
|---|---|---|---|---|
| 2.3.1.286 | ↗ | ↗ | ↗ | ↗ |

Gene location (Human)
| Chr. | Chromosome 10 (human) |
| Band | 10q21.3 | Start | 67,884,656 bp |
| Band | 10q21.3 | End | 67,918,390 bp |

Gene location (Mouse)
| Chr. | Chromosome 10 (mouse) |
| Band | 10|10 B4 | Start | 63,154,784 bp |
| Band | 10|10 B4 | End | 63,217,483 bp |
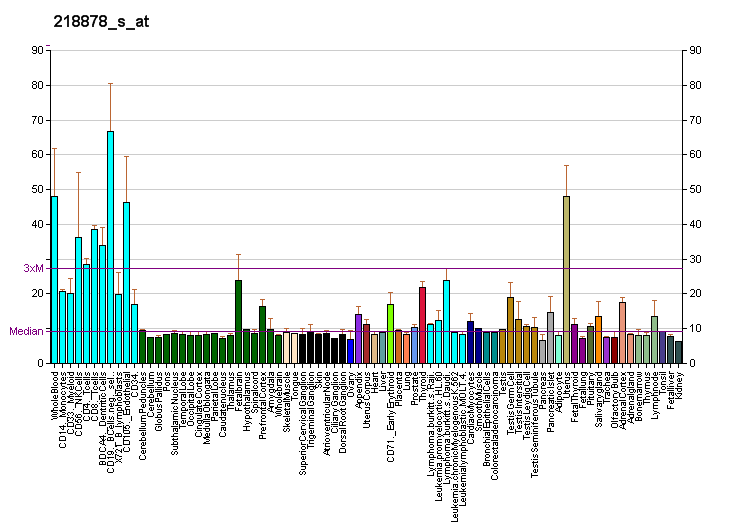
RNA expression pattern
| Bgee | Human / Mouse (ortholog); Top expressed in: Achilles tendon; ganglionic eminence; ventricular zone; gonad; testicle; gastric mucosa; right adrenal cortex; left adrenal cortex; white blood cell; monocyte / Top expressed in: spermatocyte; primitive streak; superior cervical ganglion; epiblast; hair follicle; Gonadal ridge; ciliary body; tail of embryo; genital tubercle; cumulus cell; More reference expression data |
| BioGPS | More reference expression data |
Gene ontology
| Molecular function | transcription corepressor activity; protein domain specific binding; core promoter sequence-specific DNA binding; protein C-terminus binding; keratin filament binding; transcription factor binding; metal ion binding; HLH domain binding; enzyme binding; protein deacetylase activity; histone binding; protein binding; NAD-dependent histone deacetylase activity; NAD-dependent protein deacetylase activity; histone deacetylase activity; p53 binding; mitogen-activated protein kinase binding; deacetylase activity; bHLH transcription factor binding; NAD+ binding; identical protein binding; NAD+ ADP-ribosyltransferase activity; hydrolase activity; NAD-dependent histone deacetylase activity (H3-K9 specific); DNA-binding transcription activator activity, RNA polymerase II-specific |
| Cellular component | cytoplasm; nuclear envelope; rDNA heterochromatin; chromatin silencing complex; mitochondrion; nucleus; ESC/E(Z) complex; nucleolus; chromatin; nucleoplasm; PML body; nuclear inner membrane; cytosol |
| Biological process | cellular triglyceride homeostasis; positive regulation of MHC class II biosynthetic process; DNA synthesis involved in DNA repair; positive regulation of protein phosphorylation; positive regulation of endoplasmic reticulum stress-induced intrinsic apoptotic signaling pathway; rhythmic process; single strand break repair; muscle organ development; histone H3-K9 deacetylation; negative regulation of cellular response to testosterone stimulus; regulation of peroxisome proliferator activated receptor signaling pathway; cellular response to DNA damage stimulus; regulation of bile acid biosynthetic process; DNA replication; negative regulation of TOR signaling; positive regulation of cysteine-type endopeptidase activity involved in apoptotic process; regulation of glucose metabolic process; rDNA heterochromatin assembly; negative regulation of DNA damage response, signal transduction by p53 class mediator; DNA methylation-dependent heterochromatin assembly; circadian rhythm; positive regulation of cellular senescence; spermatogenesis; intrinsic apoptotic signaling pathway in response to DNA damage; cellular response to ionizing radiation; negative regulation of helicase activity; cholesterol homeostasis; response to leptin; cellular response to hypoxia; triglyceride mobilization; negative regulation of prostaglandin biosynthetic process; proteasome-mediated ubiquitin-dependent protein catabolic process; apoptotic process; peptidyl-lysine deacetylation; negative regulation of fat cell differentiation; negative regulation of peptidyl-lysine acetylation; regulation of transcription, DNA-templated; positive regulation of adaptive immune response; stress-induced premature senescence; negative regulation of androgen receptor signaling pathway; negative regulation of transforming growth factor beta receptor signaling pathway; response to oxidative stress; negative regulation of DNA-binding transcription factor activity; negative regulation of gene expression; transcription, DNA-templated; negative regulation of cAMP-dependent protein kinase activity; pyrimidine dimer repair by nucleotide-excision repair; response to insulin; histone H3-K9 modification; positive regulation of macroautophagy; positive regulation of cholesterol efflux; protein ubiquitination; negative regulation of cell growth; positive regulation of macrophage apoptotic process; rRNA processing; regulation of brown fat cell differentiation; negative regulation of phosphorylation; viral process; DNA repair; negative regulation of neuron death; positive regulation of histone H3-K9 methylation; negative regulation of histone H3-K14 acetylation; negative regulation of protein kinase B signaling; cell differentiation; ovulation from ovarian follicle; regulation of protein serine/threonine kinase activity; negative regulation of intrinsic apoptotic signaling pathway in response to DNA damage by p53 class mediator; protein ADP-ribosylation; leptin-mediated signaling pathway; negative regulation of apoptotic process; negative regulation of transcription by RNA polymerase II; chromatin organization; negative regulation of I-kappaB kinase/NF-kappaB signaling; circadian regulation of gene expression; protein deacetylation; fatty acid homeostasis; protein destabilization; regulation of mitotic cell cycle; positive regulation of cAMP-dependent protein kinase activity; white fat cell differentiation; positive regulation of insulin receptor signaling pathway; negative regulation of transcription, DNA-templated; negative regulation of NF-kappaB transcription factor activity; peptidyl-lysine acetylation; response to hydrogen peroxide; intrinsic apoptotic signaling pathway in response to DNA damage by p53 class mediator; negative regulation of histone H4-K16 acetylation; positive regulation of endothelial cell proliferation; regulation of smooth muscle cell apoptotic process; behavioral response to starvation; cellular glucose homeostasis; cellular response to starvation; cellular response to tumor necrosis factor; positive regulation of DNA repair; multicellular organism development; regulation of cell population proliferation; positive regulation of cell population proliferation; regulation of endodeoxyribonuclease activity; regulation of cellular response to heat; positive regulation of phosphatidylinositol 3-kinase signaling; negative regulation of oxidative stress-induced intrinsic apoptotic signaling pathway; UV-damage excision repair; histone deacetylation; positive regulation of transcription by RNA polymerase II; angiogenesis; macrophage cytokine production; regulation of lipid storage; positive regulation of adipose tissue development; macrophage differentiation; transcription by RNA polymerase II; positive regulation of smooth muscle cell differentiation; negative regulation of histone H3-K9 trimethylation; positive regulation of apoptotic process; cellular response to hydrogen peroxide; histone H3 deacetylation; negative regulation of protein acetylation; regulation of apoptotic process; cellular response to leukemia inhibitory factor; positive regulation of angiogenesis; transforming growth factor beta receptor signaling pathway; positive regulation of blood vessel endothelial cell migration; negative regulation of cellular senescence |
Sources:Amigo / QuickGO
Orthologs
| Databases | NCBI: entry; OMA: entry |
| Species | Human | Mouse |
| Entrez | 23411 | 93759 |
| Ensembl | ENSG00000096717 | ENSMUSG00000020063 |
| UniProt | Q96EB6 | Q923E4 |
| RefSeq (mRNA) | NM_001142498; NM_001314049; NM_012238 | NM_001159589; NM_001159590; NM_019812 |
| RefSeq (protein) | NP_001135970; NP_001300978; NP_036370 | NP_001153061; NP_062786 |
| Location (UCSC) | Chr 10: 67.88 – 67.92 Mb | Chr 10: 63.15 – 63.22 Mb |
| PubMed search |
- Wikidata
| View/Edit Human | View/Edit Mouse |

Sirtuin 1, also known as NAD-dependent deacetylase sirtuin-1, is a protein that in humans is encoded by the SIRT1 gene.

SIRT1 stands for sirtuin (silent mating type information regulation 2 homolog) 1 (S. cerevisiae), referring to the fact that its sirtuin homolog (biological equivalent across species) in yeast (Saccharomyces cerevisiae) is Sir2. SIRT1 is an enzyme located primarily in the cell nucleus that deacetylates transcription factors that contribute to cellular regulation (reaction to stressors, longevity).

== Function ==
Sirtuin 1 is a member of the sirtuin family of proteins, homologs of the Sir2 gene in S. cerevisiae. Members of the sirtuin family are characterized by a sirtuin core domain and grouped into four classes. The functions of human sirtuins have not yet been determined; however, yeast sirtuin proteins are known to regulate epigenetic gene silencing and suppress recombination of rDNA. The protein encoded by this gene is included in class I of the sirtuin family.

Sirtuin 1 is downregulated in cells that have high insulin resistance. Furthermore, SIRT1 was shown to de-acetylate and affect the activity of both members of the PGC1-alpha/ERR-alpha complex, which are essential metabolic regulatory transcription factors.

In vitro, SIRT1 has been shown to deacetylate and thereby deactivate the p53 protein, and may have a role in activating T helper 17 cells.

== Selective ligands ==
=== Activators ===
- AL-VI10 is an amphibian peptide which acts as a SIRT1 activator.
- Lamin A is a protein that had been identified as a direct activator of Sirtuin 1 during a study on progeria.
- Resveratrol has been claimed to be an activator of sirtuin 1, but this effect has been disputed based on the fact that the initially used activity assay, using a non-physiological substrate peptide, can produce artificial results. Resveratrol increases the expression of SIRT1, meaning that it does increase the activity of SIRT1, though not necessarily by direct activation. However, resveratrol was later shown to directly activate Sirtuin 1 against non-modified peptide substrates. Resveratrol also enhances the binding between Sirtuin 1 and Lamin A. In addition to resveratrol, a range of other plant-derived polyphenols have also been shown to interact with SIRT1.
- SRT-1720 and related compounds such as SRT2104 have been claimed to be SIRT1 activators, but this has subsequently been questioned.
- Methylene blue by increasing NADH/NAD+ ratio.
- Metformin activates both PRKA and SIRT1.
- Myricanol activates NAMPT and SIRT1

Although neither resveratrol or SRT1720 directly activate SIRT1, resveratrol, and probably SRT1720, indirectly activate SIRT1 by activation of AMP-activated protein kinase (AMPK), which increases NAD+ levels (which is the cofactor required for SIRT1 activity). Elevating NAD+ is a more direct and reliable way to activate SIRT1.

=== Inhibitors ===
- 4-Bromoresveratrol
- Selisistat

== Interactions ==
Sirtuin 1 has been shown in vitro to interact with ERR-alpha and AIRE.

Human Sirt1 has been reported having 136 direct interactions in interactomic studies involved in numerous processes.

== Yeast homolog ==
Sir2 (whose homolog in mammals is known as SIRT1) was the first of the sirtuin genes to be found. It was found in budding yeast, and, since then, members of this highly conserved family have been found in nearly all organisms studied. Sirtuins are hypothesized to play a key role in an organism's response to stresses (such as heat or starvation) and to be responsible for the lifespan-extending effects of calorie restriction.

The three letter yeast gene symbol Sir stands for Silent Information Regulator while the number 2 is representative of the fact that it was the second SIR gene discovered and characterized.

In the roundworm, Caenorhabditis elegans, Sir-2.1 is used to denote the gene product most similar to yeast Sir2 in structure and activity.

=== Method of action and observed effects ===
Sirtuins act primarily by removing acetyl groups from lysine residues within proteins in the presence of NAD^{+}; thus, they are classified as "NAD^{+}-dependent deacetylases" and have EC number 3.5.1. They add the acetyl group from the protein to the ADP-ribose component of NAD^{+} to form O-acetyl-ADP-ribose. The HDAC activity of Sir2 results in tighter packaging of chromatin and a reduction in transcription at the targeted gene locus. The silencing activity of Sir2 is most prominent at telomeric sequences, the hidden MAT loci (HM loci), and the ribosomal DNA (rDNA) locus (RDN1) from which ribosomal RNA is transcribed.

Limited overexpression of the Sir2 gene results in a lifespan extension of about 30%, if the lifespan is measured as the number of cell divisions the mother cell can undergo before cell death. Concordantly, deletion of Sir2 results in a 50% reduction in lifespan. In particular, the silencing activity of Sir2, in complex with Sir3 and Sir4, at the HM loci prevents simultaneous expression of both mating factors which can cause sterility and shortened lifespan. Additionally, Sir2 activity at the rDNA locus is correlated with a decrease in the formation of rDNA circles. Chromatin silencing, as a result of Sir2 activity, reduces homologous recombination between rDNA repeats, which is the process leading to the formation of rDNA circles. As accumulation of these rDNA circles is the primary way in which yeast are believed to "age", then the action of Sir2 in preventing accumulation of these rDNA circles is a necessary factor in yeast longevity.

Starving of yeast cells leads to a similarly extended lifespan, and indeed starving increases the available amount of NAD^{+} and reduces nicotinamide, both of which have the potential to increase the activity of Sir2. Furthermore, removing the Sir2 gene eliminates the life-extending effect of caloric restriction. Experiments in the nematode Caenorhabditis elegans and in the fruit fly Drosophila melanogaster support these findings. As of 2006, experiments in mice are underway.

However, some other findings call the above interpretation into question. If one measures the lifespan of a yeast cell as the amount of time it can live in a non-dividing stage, then silencing the Sir2 gene actually increases lifespan Furthermore, calorie restriction can substantially prolong reproductive lifespan in yeast even in the absence of Sir2.

In organisms more complicated than yeast, it appears that Sir2 acts by deacetylation of several other proteins besides histones.

In the fruit fly Drosophila melanogaster, the Sir2 gene does not seem to be essential; loss of a sirtuin gene has only very subtle effects. However, mice lacking the SIRT1 gene (the sir2 biological equivalent) were smaller than normal at birth, often died early or became sterile.

== Inhibition of SIRT1 ==
Human aging is characterized by a chronic, low-grade inflammation level, and the pro-inflammatory transcription factor NF-κB is the main transcriptional regulator of genes related to inflammation. SIRT1 inhibits NF-κB-regulated gene expression by deacetylating the RelA/p65 subunit of NF-κB at lysine 310. But NF-κB more strongly inhibits SIRT1. NF-κB increases the levels of the microRNA miR-34a (which inhibits nicotinamide adenine dinucleotide NAD+ synthesis) by binding to its promoter region, resulting in lower levels of SIRT1.

Both the SIRT1 enzyme and the poly ADP-ribose polymerase 1 (PARP1) enzyme require NAD+ for activation. PARP1 is a DNA repair enzyme, so in conditions of high DNA damage, NAD+ levels can be reduced 20–30% thereby reducing SIRT1 activity.

== Homologous recombination ==
SIRT1 protein actively promotes homologous recombination (HR) in human cells, and likely promotes recombinational repair of DNA breaks. SIRT1-mediated HR requires the WRN protein. WRN protein functions in double-strand break repair by HR. WRN protein is a RecQ helicase, and in its mutated form gives rise to Werner syndrome, a genetic condition in humans characterized by numerous features of premature aging. These findings link SIRT1 function to HR, a DNA repair process that is likely necessary for maintaining the integrity of the genome during aging.
