= Histone deacetylase =

Class of enzymes important in regulating DNA transcription

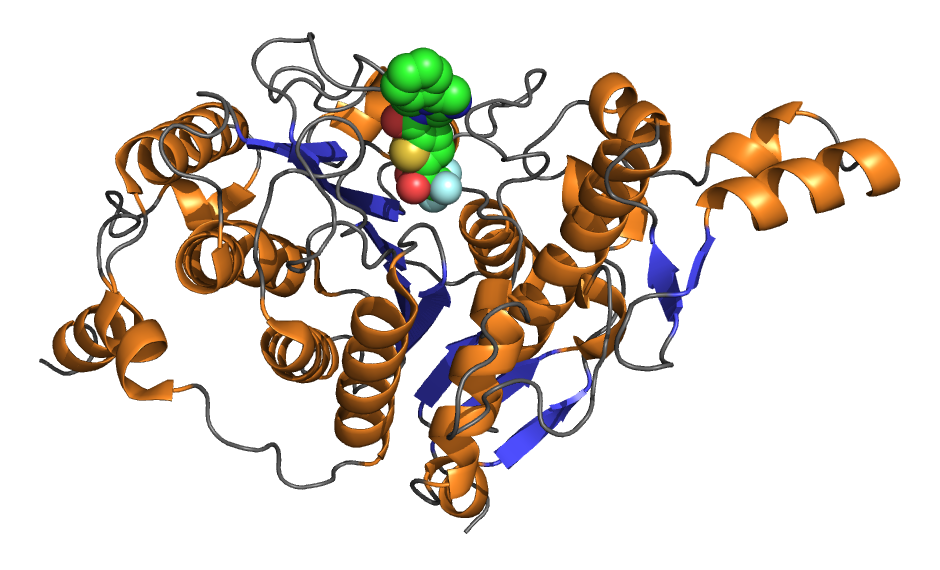
- Catalytic domain of human histone deacetylase 4 with bound inhibitor. PDB rendering based on 2vqj.

Identifiers
- EC no.: 3.5.1.98
- CAS no.: 9076-57-7

Databases
- BRENDA: enzyme data
- ExPASy: NiceZyme view
- KEGG: enzyme entry
- MetaCyc: metabolic pathway
- Rhea: reactions
- PDB structures: RCSB PDB PDBe PDBsum
- Gene Ontology: AmiGO / QuickGO
Search
- PMC: articles
- PubMed: articles
- NCBI: proteins

Histone deacetylase superfamily

Identifiers
- Symbol: Hist_deacetyl
- Pfam: PF00850
- InterPro: IPR000286
- SCOP2: 1c3s / SCOPe / SUPFAM
Available protein structures:
- PDB: IPR000286 PF00850 (ECOD; PDBsum)
- AlphaFold: IPR000286; PF00850

Histone deacetylases (EC 3.5.1.98, HDAC) are a class of enzymes that remove acetyl groups (O=C-CH_{3}) from an ε-N-acetyl lysine amino acid on both histone and non-histone proteins. HDACs allow histones to wrap the DNA more tightly. This is important because DNA is wrapped around histones, and DNA expression is regulated by acetylation and de-acetylation. HDAC's action is opposite to that of histone acetyltransferase. HDAC proteins are now also called lysine deacetylases (KDAC), to describe their function rather than their target, which also includes non-histone proteins. In general, they suppress gene expression.

== HDAC super family ==
Together with the acetylpolyamine amidohydrolases and the acetoin utilization proteins, the histone deacetylases form an ancient protein superfamily known as the histone deacetylase superfamily.

== Classes of HDACs in higher eukaryotes ==
HDACs, are classified in four classes depending on sequence homology to the yeast original enzymes and domain organization:

HDAC classification in higher eukaryotes
Class	Members	Catalytic sites	Subcellular localization	Tissue distribution	Substrates	Binding partners	Knockout phenotype
I	HDAC1	1	Nucleus	Ubiquitous	Androgen receptor, SHP, p53, MyoD, E2F1, STAT3	–	Embryonic lethal, increased histone acetylation, increase in p21 and p27
I	HDAC2	1	Nucleus	Ubiquitous	Glucocorticoid receptor, YY1, BCL6, STAT3	–	Cardiac defect
I	HDAC3	1	Nucleus	Ubiquitous	SHP, YY1, GATA1, RELA, STAT3, MEF2D	NCOR1	–
I	HDAC8	1	Nucleus/cytoplasm	Ubiquitous?	–	EST1B	–
IIA	HDAC4	1	Nucleus / cytoplasm	heart, skeletal muscle, brain	GCMA, GATA1, HP1	RFXANK	Defects in chondrocyte differentiation
IIA	HDAC5	1	Nucleus / cytoplasm	heart, skeletal muscle, brain	GCMA, SMAD7, HP1	REA, estrogen receptor	Cardiac defect
IIA	HDAC7	1	Nucleus / cytoplasm / mitochondria	heart, skeletal muscle, pancreas, placenta	PLAG1, PLAG2	HIF1A, BCL6, endothelin receptor, ACTN1, ACTN4, androgen receptor, Tip60	Maintenance of vascular integrity, increase in MMP10
IIA	HDAC9	1	Nucleus / cytoplasm	brain, skeletal muscle	–	FOXP3	Cardiac defect
IIB	HDAC6	2	Mostly cytoplasm	heart, liver, kidney, placenta	α-Tubulin, HSP90, SHP, SMAD7	RUNX2	–
IIB	HDAC10	1	Mostly cytoplasm	liver, spleen, kidney	–	–	–
III	sirtuins in mammals (SIRT1, SIRT2, SIRT3, SIRT4, SIRT5, SIRT6, SIRT7)	–	–	–	–	–	–
III	Sir2 in the yeast S. cerevisiae	–	–	–	–	–	–
IV	HDAC11	2	Nucleus / cytoplasm	brain, heart, skeletal muscle, kidney	–	–	–

HDAC (except class III) contain zinc and are known as Zn^{2+}-dependent histone deacetylases. They feature a classical arginase fold and are structurally and mechanistically distinct from sirtuins (class III), which fold into a Rossmann architecture and are NAD^{+} dependent.

== Subtypes ==
HDAC proteins are grouped into four classes (see above) based on function and DNA sequence similarity. Class I, II and IV are considered "classical" HDACs whose activities are inhibited by trichostatin A (TSA) and have a zinc dependent active site, whereas Class III enzymes are a family of NAD^{+}-dependent proteins known as sirtuins and are not affected by TSA. Homologues to these three groups are found in yeast having the names: reduced potassium dependency 3 (Rpd3), which corresponds to Class I; histone deacetylase 1 (hda1), corresponding to Class II; and silent information regulator 2 (Sir2), corresponding to Class III. Class IV contains just one isoform (HDAC11), which is not highly homologous with either Rpd3 or hda1 yeast enzymes, and therefore HDAC11 is assigned to its own class. The Class III enzymes are considered a separate type of enzyme and have a different mechanism of action; these enzymes are NAD^{+}-dependent, whereas HDACs in other classes require Zn^{2+} as a cofactor.

== Evolution ==
HDACs are conserved across evolution, showing orthologs in all eukaryotes and even in Archaea. All upper eukaryotes, including vertebrates, plants and arthropods, possess at least one HDAC per class, while most vertebrates carry the 11 canonical HDACs, with the exception of bone fish, which lack HDAC2 but appears to have an extra copy of HDAC11, dubbed HDAC12. Plants carry additional HDACs compared to animals, putatively to carry out the more complex transcriptional regulation required by these sessile organisms. HDACs appear to be deriving from an ancestral acetyl-binding domain, as HDAC homologs have been found in bacteria in the form of Acetoin utilization proteins (AcuC) proteins.

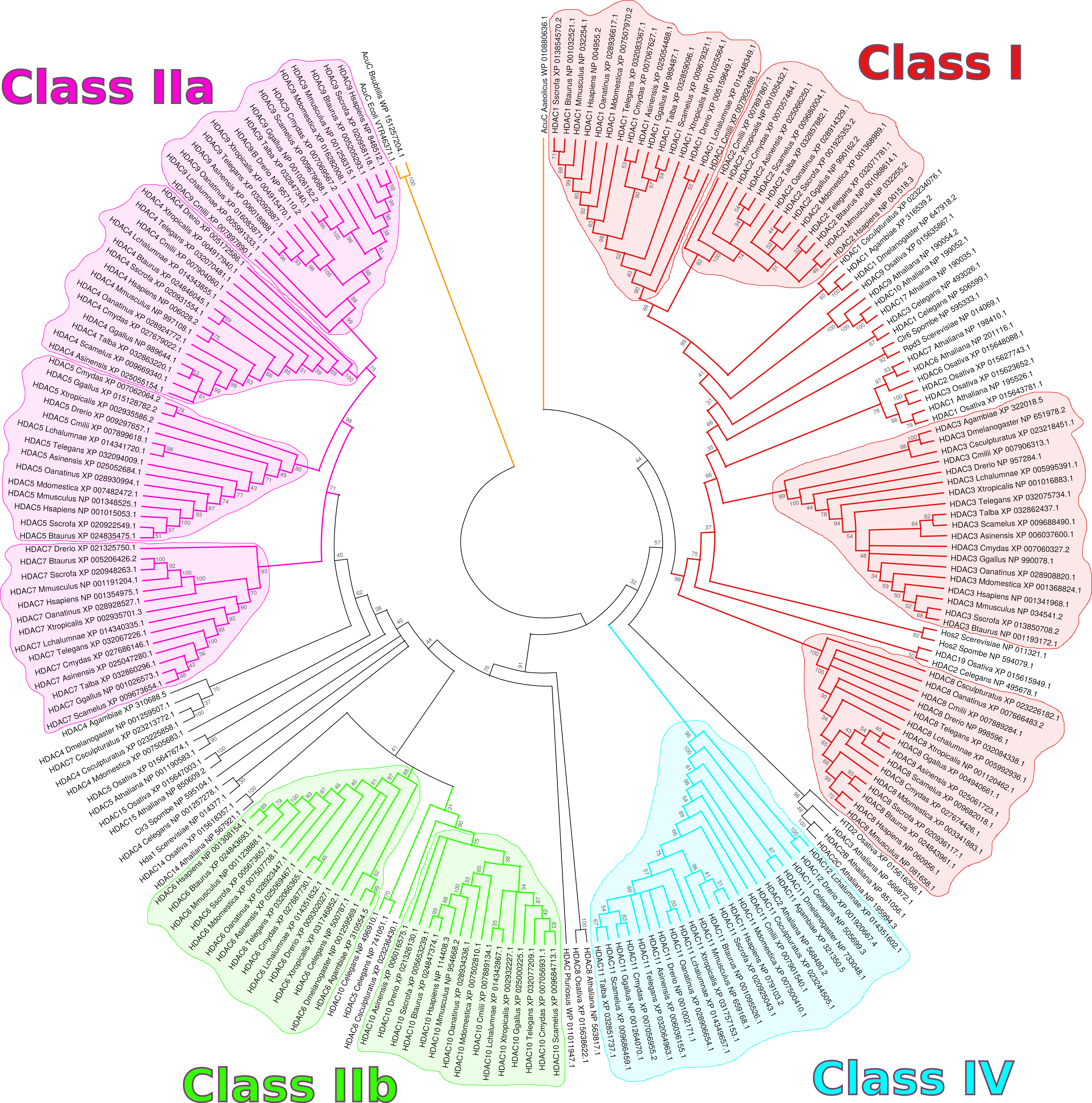
Topological phylogenetic tree representation of 226 members of the HDAC protein family.

== Subcellular distribution ==
Within the Class I HDACs, HDAC1, 2, and 3 are found primarily in the nucleus, whereas HDAC8 is found in both the nucleus and the cytoplasm, and is also membrane-associated. Class II HDACs (HDAC4, 5, 6, 7 9, and 10) are able to shuttle in and out of the nucleus, depending on different signals.

HDAC6 is a cytoplasmic, microtubule-associated enzyme. HDAC6 deacetylates tubulin, Hsp90, and cortactin, and forms complexes with other partner proteins, and is, therefore, involved in a variety of biological processes.

== Function ==
=== Histone modification ===
Histone tails are normally positively charged due to amine groups present on their lysine and arginine amino acids. These positive charges help the histone tails to interact with and bind to the negatively charged phosphate groups on the DNA backbone. Acetylation, which occurs normally in a cell, neutralizes the positive charges on the histone by changing amines into amides and decreases the ability of the histones to bind to DNA. This decreased binding allows chromatin expansion, permitting genetic transcription to take place. Histone deacetylases remove those acetyl groups, increasing the positive charge of histone tails and encouraging high-affinity binding between the histones and DNA backbone. The increased DNA binding condenses DNA structure, preventing transcription.

Histone deacetylase is involved in a series of pathways within the living system. According to the Kyoto Encyclopedia of Genes and Genomes (KEGG), these are:

- Environmental information processing; signal transduction; notch signaling pathway PATH:ko04330
- Cellular processes; cell growth and death; cell cycle PATH:ko04110
- Human diseases; cancers; chronic myeloid leukemia PATH:ko05220

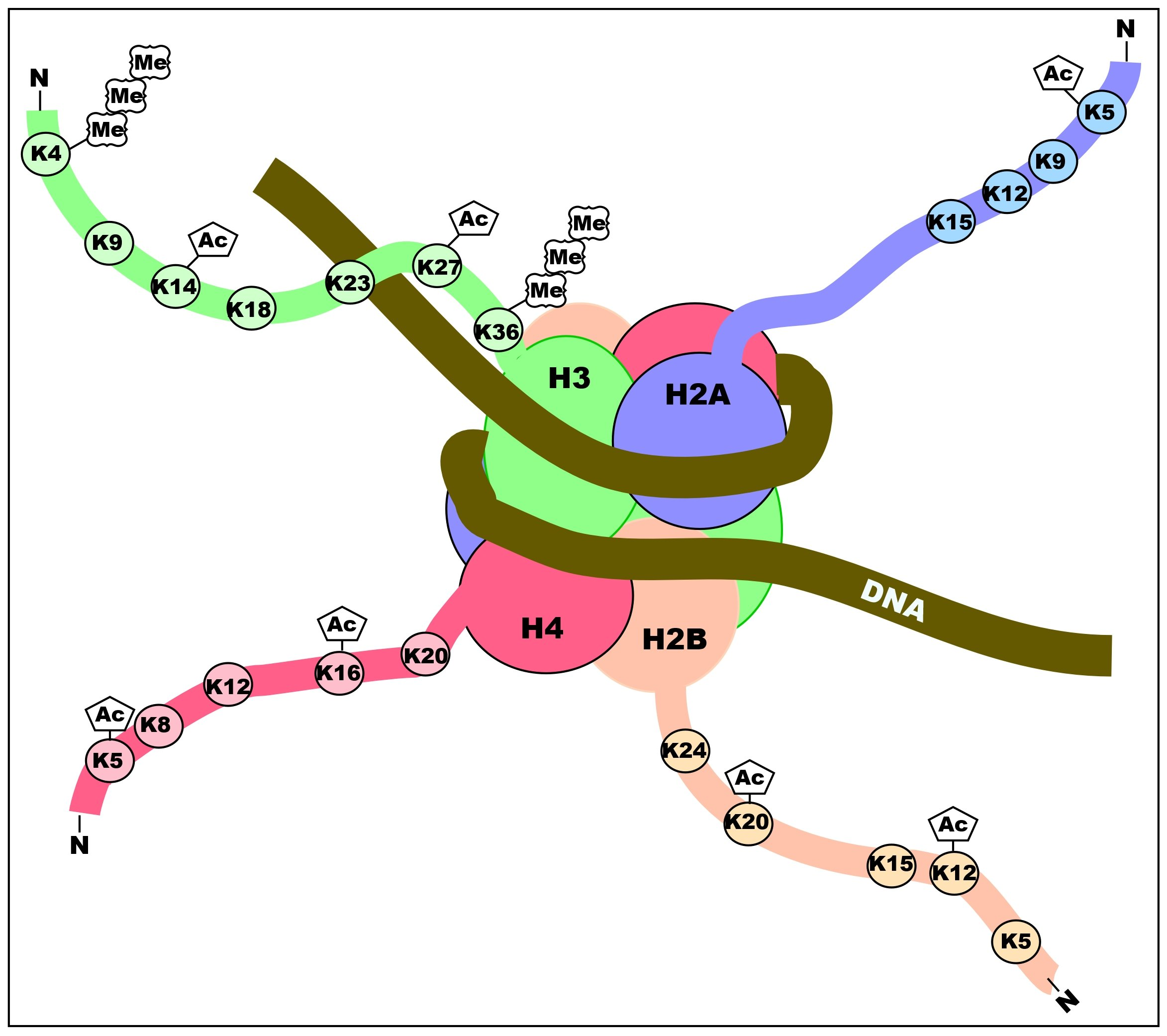
Some activation signals on a nucleosome: Nucleosomes consist of four pairs of histone proteins in a tightly assembled core region plus up to 30% of each histone remaining in a loosely organized tail (only one tail of each pair is shown). DNA is wrapped around the histone core proteins in chromosomes. The lysines (K) are designated with a number showing their position as, for instance (K4), indicating lysine as the 4th amino acid from the amino (N) end of the tail in the histone protein. Methylations {Me}, and acetylations [Ac] are common post-translational modifications on the lysines of the histone tails.

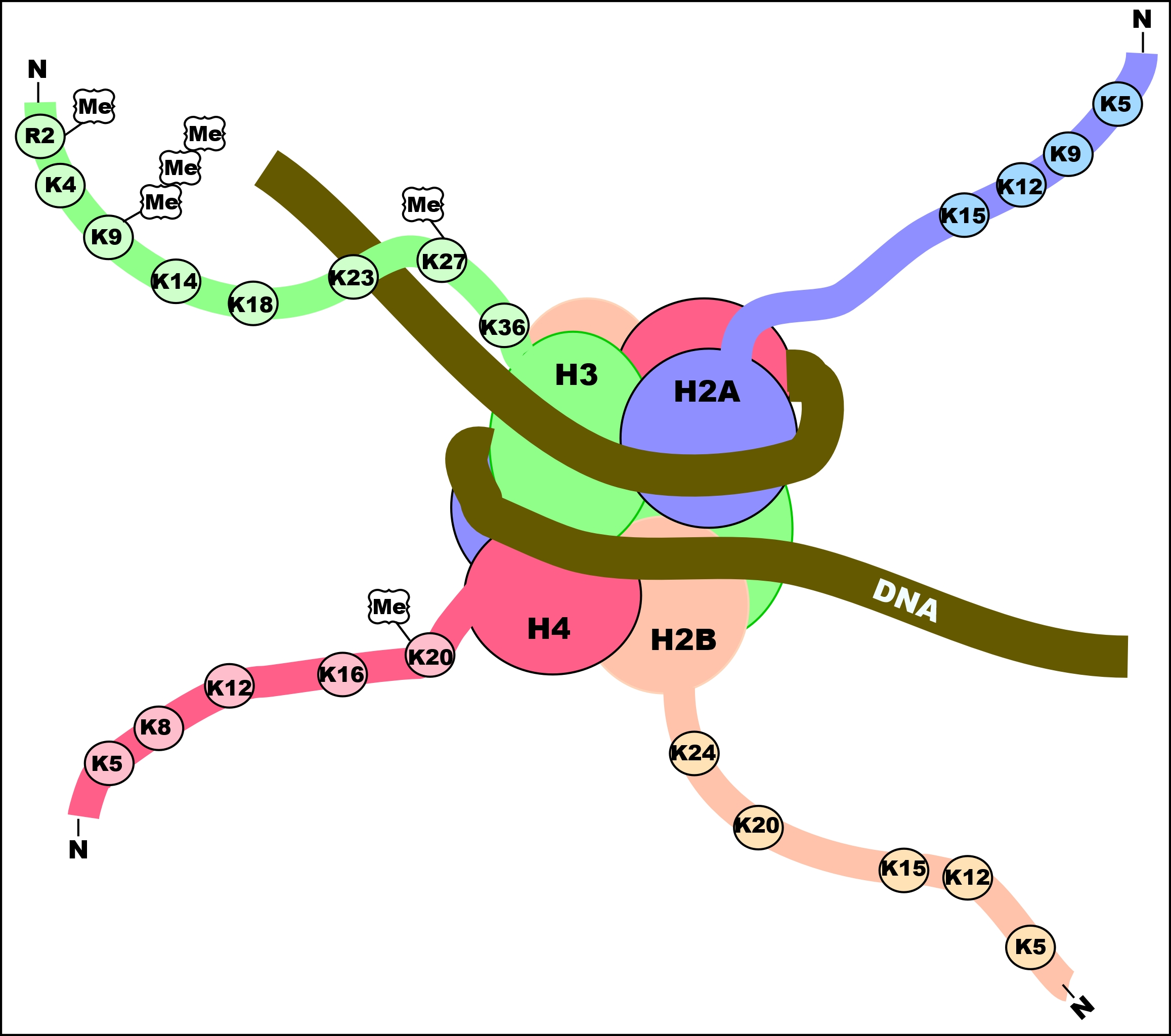
Some repression signals on a nucleosome.

Histone acetylation plays an important role in the regulation of gene expression. Hyperacetylated chromatin is transcriptionally active, and hypoacetylated chromatin is silent. A study on mice found that a specific subset of mouse genes (7%) was deregulated in the absence of HDAC1. Their study also found a regulatory crosstalk between HDAC1 and HDAC2 and suggest a novel function for HDAC1 as a transcriptional coactivator. HDAC1 expression was found to be increased in the prefrontal cortex of schizophrenia subjects, negatively correlating with the expression of GAD67 mRNA.

=== Non-histone effects ===
It is a mistake to regard HDACs solely in the context of regulating gene transcription by modifying histones and chromatin structure, although that appears to be the predominant function. The function, activity, and stability of proteins can be controlled by post-translational modifications. Protein phosphorylation is perhaps the most widely studied and understood modification in which certain amino acid residues are phosphorylated by the action of protein kinases or dephosphorylated by the action of phosphatases. The acetylation of lysine residues is emerging as an analogous mechanism, in which non-histone proteins are acted on by acetylases and deacetylases. It is in this context that HDACs are being found to interact with a variety of non-histone proteins—some of these are transcription factors and co-regulators, some are not. Note the following four examples:

- HDAC6 is associated with aggresomes. Misfolded protein aggregates are tagged by ubiquitination and removed from the cytoplasm by dynein motors via the microtubule network to an organelle termed the aggresome. HDAC 6 binds polyubiquitinated misfolded proteins and links to dynein motors, thereby allowing the misfolded protein cargo to be physically transported to chaperones and proteasomes for subsequent destruction. HDAC6 is important regulator of HSP90 function and its inhibitor proposed to treat metabolic disorders.
- PTEN is an important phosphatase involved in cell signaling via phosphoinositols and the AKT/PI3 kinase pathway. PTEN is subject to complex regulatory control via phosphorylation, ubiquitination, oxidation and acetylation. Acetylation of PTEN by the histone acetyltransferase p300/CBP-associated factor (PCAF) can repress its activity; on the converse, deacetylation of PTEN by SIRT1 deacetylase and, by HDAC1, can stimulate its activity.
- APE1/Ref-1 (APEX1) is a multifunctional protein possessing both DNA repair activity (on abasic and single-strand break sites) and transcriptional regulatory activity associated with oxidative stress. APE1/Ref-1 is acetylated by PCAF; on the converse, it is stably associated with and deacetylated by Class I HDACs. The acetylation state of APE1/Ref-1 does not appear to affect its DNA repair activity, but it does regulate its transcriptional activity such as its ability to bind to the PTH promoter and initiate transcription of the parathyroid hormone gene.
- NF-κB is a key transcription factor and effector molecule involved in responses to cell stress, consisting of a p50/p65 heterodimer. The p65 subunit is controlled by acetylation via PCAF and by deacetylation via HDAC3 and HDAC6.

These are just some examples of constantly emerging non-histone, non-chromatin roles for HDACs.

== HDAC inhibitors ==
Histone deacetylase inhibitors (HDIs) have a long history of use in psychiatry and neurology as mood stabilizers and anti-epileptics, for example, valproic acid. In more recent times, HDIs are being studied as a mitigator or treatment for neurodegenerative diseases. Also in recent years, there has been an effort to develop HDIs for cancer therapy. Vorinostat (SAHA) was FDA approved in 2006 for the treatment of cutaneous manifestations in patients with cutaneous T cell lymphoma (CTCL) that have failed previous treatments. A second HDI, Istodax (romidepsin), was approved in 2009 for patients with CTCL. The exact mechanisms by which the compounds may work are unclear, but epigenetic pathways are proposed. In addition, a clinical trial is studying valproic acid effects on the latent pools of HIV in infected persons. HDIs are currently being investigated as chemosensitizers for cytotoxic chemotherapy or radiation therapy, or in association with DNA methylation inhibitors based on in vitro synergy. Isoform selective HDIs which can aid in elucidating role of individual HDAC isoforms have been developed.

HDAC inhibitors have effects on non-histone proteins that are related to acetylation. HDIs can alter the degree of acetylation of these molecules and, therefore, increase or repress their activity. For the four examples given above (see Function) on HDACs acting on non-histone proteins, in each of those instances the HDAC inhibitor Trichostatin A (TSA) blocks the effect. HDIs have been shown to alter the activity of many transcription factors, including ACTR, cMyb, E2F1, EKLF, FEN 1, GATA, HNF-4, HSP90, Ku70, NFκB, PCNA, p53, RB, Runx, SF1 Sp3, STAT, TFIIE, TCF, and YY1.

The short-chain fatty acid butyric acid (butyrate), made by gut bacteria, is an endogenous histone deacetylase inhibitor. The ketone body β-hydroxybutyrate (BHB) has been shown in mice to increase gene expression of FOXO3a by histone deacetylase inhibition.

Histone deacetylase inhibitors may modulate the latency of some viruses, resulting in reactivation. This has been shown to occur, for instance, with a latent human herpesvirus-6 infection.

Histone deacetylase inhibitors have shown activity against certain Plasmodium species and stages which may indicate they have potential in malaria treatment. It has been shown that HDIs accumulate acetylated histone H3K9/H3K14, a downstream target of class I HDACs.

== See also ==
- Histone acetyltransferase (HAT)
- Histone deacetylase inhibitor
- Histone methyltransferase (HMT)
- Histone-modifying enzymes
- RNA polymerase control by chromatin structure
