= Sanjeev Das =

Indian cancer biologist and a scientist

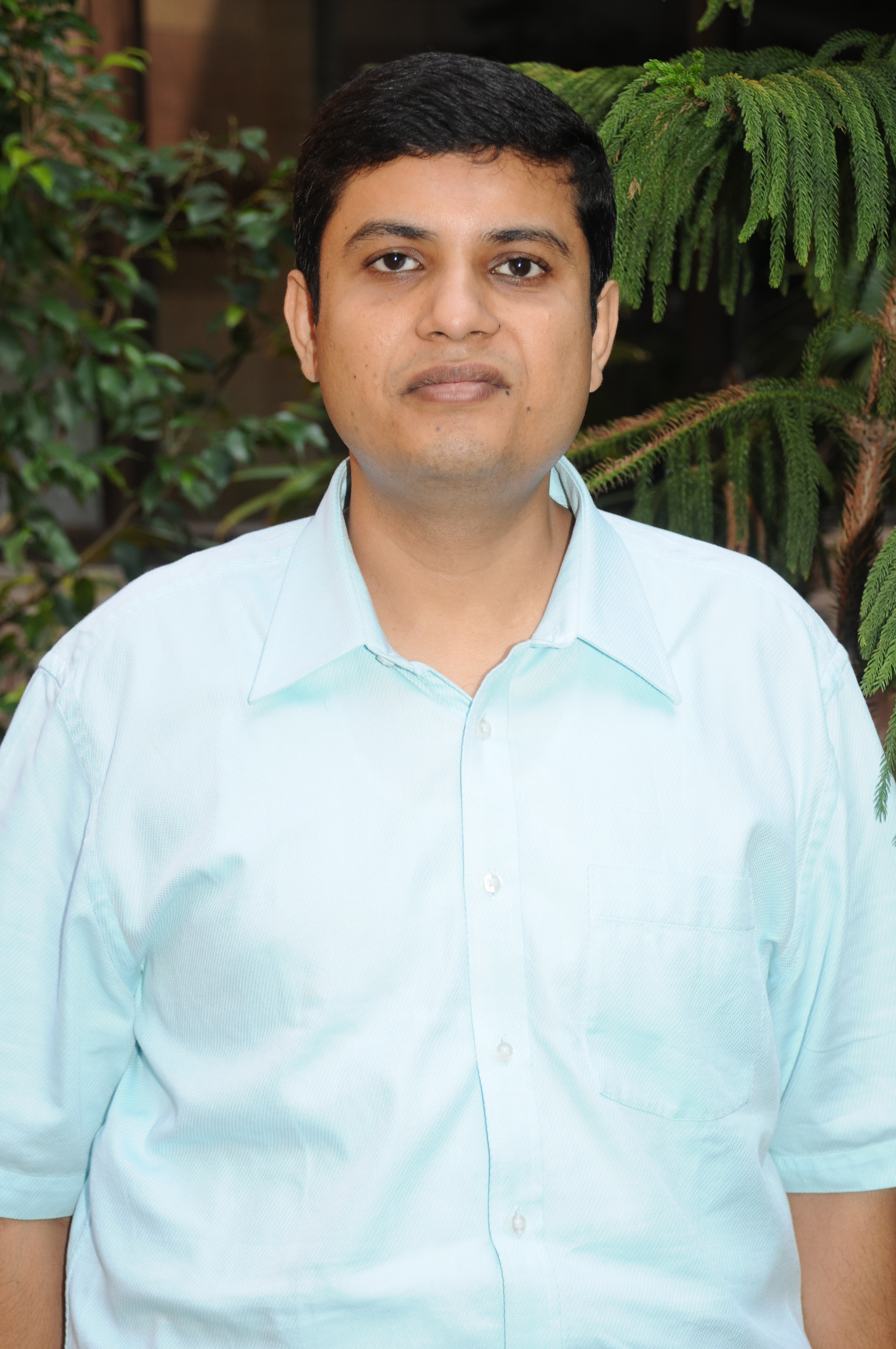
- Born: 27 August 1976 (age 50)
- Education: Science College; University of Calcutta; Indian Institute of Science
- Known for: Studies on p53 and sirtuins
- Awards: 2014 NASI-SCOPUS Young Scientist Award; 2015 N-BIOS Prize; 2016 ICMR Shakuntala Amir Chand Prize; 2017 ISCA Prof. Umakant Sinha Memorial Award; 2017 Shanti Swarup Bhatnagar Prize
- Scientific career
- Fields: Cancer biology
- Workplaces: Cutaneous Biology Research Center; Harvard Medical School; National Institute of Immunology, India

Sanjeev Das (born 27 August 1976) is an Indian cancer biologist and a scientist at National Institute of Immunology, New Delhi, India. He is well regarded for his studies on tumor suppressor proteins. He is a recipient of the National Bioscience Award for Career Development of the Department of Biotechnology. The Council of Scientific and Industrial Research, the apex agency of the Government of India for scientific research, awarded him the Shanti Swarup Bhatnagar Prize for Science and Technology, one of the highest Indian science awards, for his contributions to biological sciences in 2017. (Note: Long link - please select award year to see details)

== Biography ==
Sanjeev Das was born on 27 August 1976 to Wg Cdr P K Das (retd) and Gopa Das at Ajmer (Nasirabad Cantt), Rajasthan, India. He earned his master's degree (MSc) from the University College of Science & Technology, University of Calcutta and continued his studies at the Indian Institute of Science from where he secured a PhD. His post -doctoral studies were in the US, at the Cutaneous Biology Research Center of Massachusetts General Hospital and Harvard Medical School. Returning to India, he joined the National Institute of Immunology, India as a faculty where he is a set up the Molecular Oncology Laboratory.

Sanjeev is married to Rajashree and has a daughter Mrinalini. The family lives in NII campus in New Delhi.

== Legacy ==
The research of Sanjeev Das has been focusing on the various aspects of cancer biology which is reported to have assisted in widening the understanding of the functioning of P53 and sirtuins. He is also involved in research on tumor suppressor proteins, tumor cell metabolism and tumorigenesis, especially the impact of regulatory networks and metabolic processes. His studies have been documented by way of a number of research articles in peer-reviewed journals. (Note: Please see Selected bibliography section)

== Awards and honors ==
Das received the NASI-SCOPUS Young Scientist Award jointly awarded by the National Academy of Sciences, India and Elsevier in 2014 and the National Bioscience Award for Career Development of the Department of Biotechnology in 2015. The Indian Council of Medical Research awarded him the Shakuntala Amir Chand Prize in 2016 and he received the Prof. Umakant Sinha Memorial Award of the Indian Science Congress Association in 2017. The Council of Scientific and Industrial Research awarded him the Shanti Swarup Bhatnagar Prize, one of the highest Indian science awards the same year. The award orations delivered by him include the 2016 edition of the Prof. B. K. Bachhawat Memorial Young Scientist Lecture of the National Academy of Sciences, India. In 2018, he became a laureate of the Asian Scientist 100 by the Asian Scientist.

== Selected bibliography ==
- 1. Sen N, Satija YK and Das S. PGC-1alpha, a key modulator of p53, promotes cell survival upon metabolic stress (2011). Molecular Cell, 44, 621-634. 2. Sen N, Kumari R, Singh MI and Das S^{*}. HDAC5, a key component in temporal regulation of p53-mediated transactivation in response to genotoxic stress (2013). Molecular Cell, 52, 406-420. 3. Bhardwaj A and Das S. SIRT6 deacetylates PKM2 to suppress its nuclear localization and oncogenic functions (2016). Proc Natl Acad Sci USA, 113, E538-E547. 4. Satija YK and Das S. Tyr99 phosphorylation determines the regulatory milieu of tumor suppressor p73 (2016). Oncogene, 35, 513–527.

== See also ==
- Tumor antigen
- Protein deacetylase
