= 4-Acetamidobutanal =

Endogenous GABA precursor

Names
- Preferred IUPAC name N-(4-Oxobutyl)acetamide
- Other names N-Acetyl-γ-aminobutyraldehyde; N-Acetyl-gamma-aminobutyraldehyde; N-Acetyl-GABAL; N-Acetyl-γ-ABAL; N-Acetyl-gamma-ABAL; N-Acetyl-GABA aldehyde; 4-Acetamidobutanal

Identifiers
CAS Number	24431-54-7
3D model (JSmol)	Interactive image
Beilstein Reference	1925525
ChEBI	CHEBI:7386
ChemSpider	389692
KEGG	C05936
PubChem CID	440850
CompTox Dashboard (EPA)	DTXSID30331531
- InChI: InChI=1S/C6H11NO2/c1-6(9)7-4-2-3-5-8/h5H,2-4H2,1H3,(H,7,9) Key: DDSLGZOYEPKPSJ-UHFFFAOYSA-N
- SMILES: CC(=O)NCCCC=O

Properties
Chemical formula	C_{6}H_{11}NO_{2}
Molar mass	129.16 g/mol
- Except where otherwise noted, data are given for materials in their standard state (at 25 °C [77 °F], 100 kPa). Infobox references

4-Acetamidobutanal, also known as N-acetyl-γ-aminobutyraldehyde, N-acetyl-GABAL, or N-acetyl-GABA aldehyde, is a metabolic intermediate in the biosynthesis of γ-aminobutyric acid (GABA) from putrescine. Other intermediates in this pathway include N-acetylputrescine and N-acetyl-γ-aminobutyric acid (N-acetyl-GABA). Enzymes mediating the transformations in this pathway include putrescine acetyltransferase (PAT), monoamine oxidase B (MAO-B), aldehyde dehydrogenase (ALDH), and an unknown deacetylase enzyme. The pathway is a minor pathway in GABA synthesis compared to the main pathway in which GABA is synthesized from glutamate. However, the pathway has been found to have an important physiological role in the brain, for instance in the production of GABA in the striatum and resultant inhibition of dopaminergic neurons in this brain area.
