= Acyl-lysine deacylase =

Class of enzymes

Identifiers
- EC no.: 3.5.1.17
- CAS no.: 9025-11-0

Databases
- BRENDA: enzyme data
- ExPASy: NiceZyme view
- KEGG: enzyme entry
- MetaCyc: metabolic pathway
- Rhea: reactions
- PDB structures: RCSB PDB PDBe PDBsum
- Gene Ontology: AmiGO / QuickGO
Search
- PMC: articles
- PubMed: articles
- NCBI: proteins

Acyl-lysine deacylase (EC 3.5.1.17) is an enzyme that catalyzes the general chemical reaction in which an acyl group is removed from the amino acid, L-lysine, by hydrolysis:

N_{6}-acyl-L-lysine + H_{2}O $\rightleftharpoons$ a carboxylate + L-lysine

For example, the enzyme characterised from rat kidney converts acetyllysine to lysine and acetic acid:

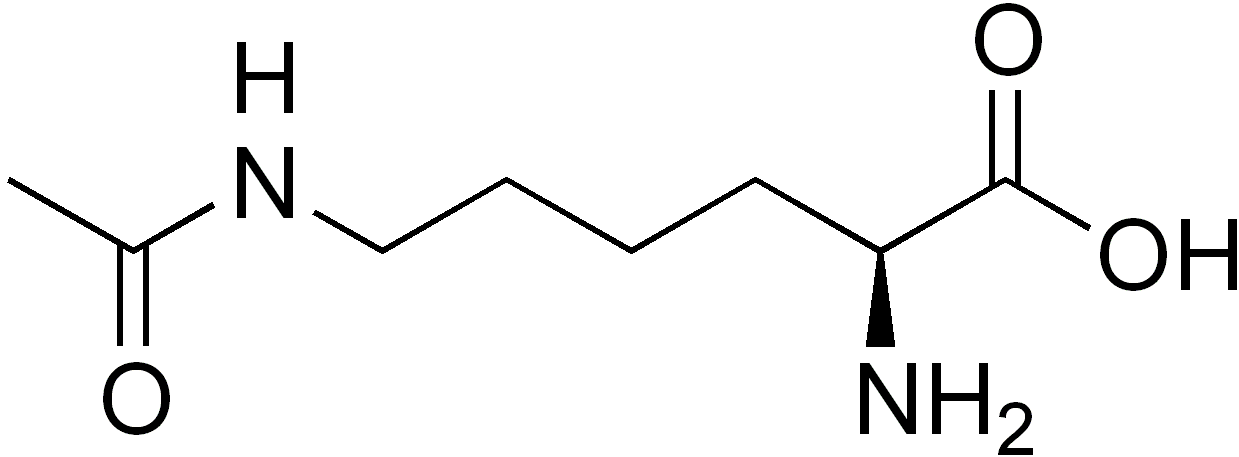
acetyllysine
H_{2}O
L-lysine
+
acetic acid

In some cases, the lysine is incorporated in proteins and the enzyme class is called the sirtuins, a type of protein deacetylase.

This enzyme is a hydrolase, one acting on carbon-nitrogen bonds other than peptide bonds, specifically in linear amides. The systematic name of this enzyme class is N6-acyl-L-lysine amidohydrolase. Other names in common use include epsilon-lysine acylase, and 6-N-acyl-L-lysine amidohydrolase.
