= Acetylputrescine deacetylase =

Class of enzymes

Identifiers
- EC no.: 3.5.1.62
- CAS no.: 103679-48-7

Databases
- BRENDA: enzyme data
- ExPASy: NiceZyme view
- KEGG: enzyme entry
- MetaCyc: metabolic pathway
- Rhea: reactions
- PDB structures: RCSB PDB PDBe PDBsum
- Gene Ontology: AmiGO / QuickGO
Search
- PMC: articles
- PubMed: articles
- NCBI: proteins

Acetylputrescine deacetylase (EC 3.5.1.62) is an enzyme characterised from Micrococcus luteus that catalyzes the hydrolysis of N-acetylputrescine to putrescine and acetic acid:

N-acetylputrescine
H_{2}O
putrescine
+ CH_{3}COOH

This enzyme is a hydrolase, one acting on carbon-nitrogen bonds other than peptide bonds, specifically in linear amides. The systematic name of this enzyme class is N-acetylputrescine acetylhydrolase.
