= N-Acetyl-γ-aminobutyric acid =

Endogenous GABA precursor

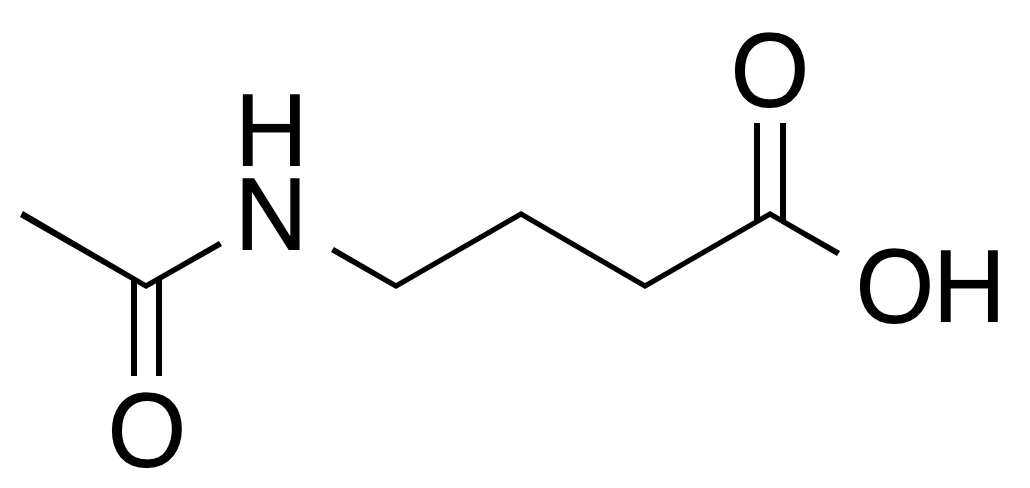

Names
- IUPAC name 4-acetamidobutanoic acid
- Other names N-Acetyl-GABA; N-Acetyl-4-aminobutyric acid

Identifiers
CAS Number	3025-96-5
3D model (JSmol)	Interactive image
ChEBI	CHEBI:17645
ChemSpider	17180
ECHA InfoCard	100.019.261
EC Number	221-186-1
KEGG	C02946
PubChem CID	18189
UNII	3A70KD310L
CompTox Dashboard (EPA)	DTXSID50184344
- InChI: InChI=1S/C6H11NO3/c1-5(8)7-4-2-3-6(9)10/h2-4H2,1H3,(H,7,8)(H,9,10) Key: UZTFMUBKZQVKLK-UHFFFAOYSA-N
- SMILES: CC(=O)NCCCC(=O)O

Properties
Chemical formula	C_{6}H_{11}NO_{3}
Molar mass	145.158 g·mol^{−1}
- Except where otherwise noted, data are given for materials in their standard state (at 25 °C [77 °F], 100 kPa). Infobox references

N-Acetyl-γ-aminobutyric acid (N-acetyl-GABA), also known as N-acetyl-4-aminobutyric acid, is a metabolic intermediate in the biosynthesis of γ-aminobutyric acid (GABA) from putrescine. Other intermediates in this pathway include N-acetylputrescine and N-acetyl-γ-aminobutyraldehyde (N-acetyl-GABAL or N-acetyl-GABA aldehyde). Enzymes mediating the transformations in this pathway include putrescine acetyltransferase (PAT), monoamine oxidase B (MAO-B), aldehyde dehydrogenase (ALDH), and an unknown deacetylase enzyme. The pathway is a minor pathway in GABA synthesis compared to the main pathway in which GABA is synthesized from glutamate. However, the pathway has been found to have an important physiological role in the brain, for instance in the production of GABA in the striatum and resultant inhibition of dopaminergic neurons in this brain area.
