= C6H11NO3 =

The molecular formula C_{6}H_{11}NO_{3} (molar mass: 145.16 g/mol, exact mass: 145.0739 u) may refer to:

- N-Acetyl-γ-aminobutyric acid
- Allysine
- Methyl aminolevulinate (MAL)
