= C25H25NO6 =

The molecular formula C_{25}H_{25}NO_{6} (molar mass: 435.476 g/mol) may refer to:

- MC3138
- Epanorin
