= CobB =

Bacterial protein

NAD-dependent protein deacylase
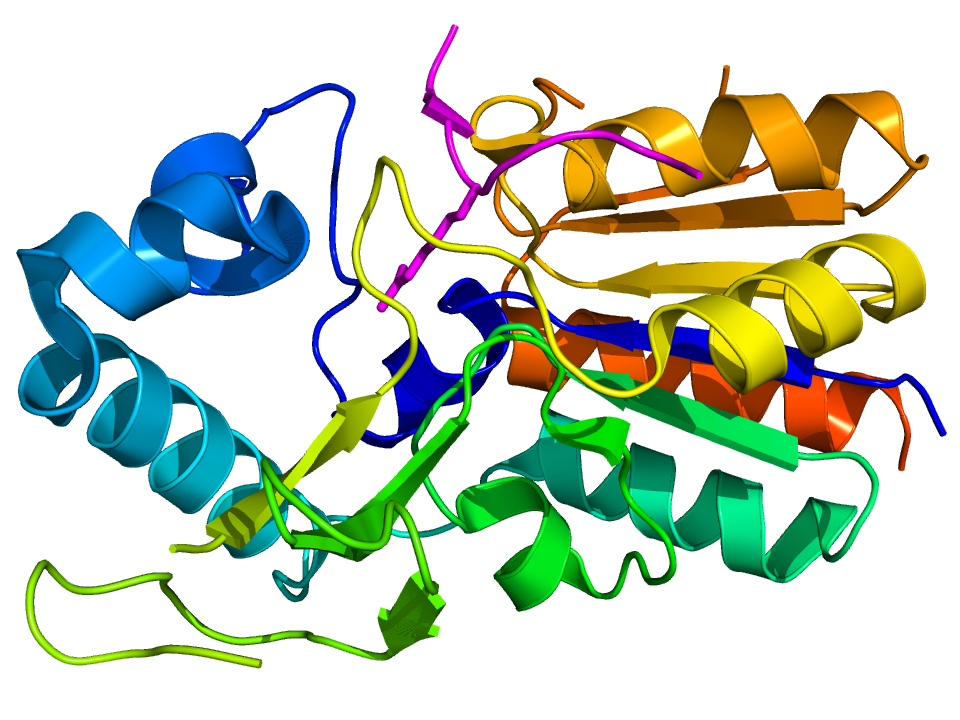
- Crystallographic structure of the CobB protein (rainbow colored, N-terminus = blue, C-terminus = red) complexed with a portion of histone H4 (magenta) where the sidechain of acylated lysine-16 is displayed as stick diagram.

Identifiers
- Organism: Escherichia coli
- Symbol: cobB
- Alt. symbols: ECK1106; ycfY
- Entrez: 945687
- Orthologs: NCBI: entry; OMA: entry
- PDB: 1S5P
- RefSeq (Prot): NP_415638.3
- UniProt: P75960

Other data
- EC number: 2.3.1.286
- Chromosome: Genome: 1.18 - 1.18 Mb
Search for
- Structures: Swiss-model
- Domains: InterPro

CobB is a bacterial protein that belongs to the sirtuin family, a broadly conserved family of NAD+-dependent protein deacetylases.

== Structure ==
CobB is a bacterial protein that belongs to the sirtuin family, a broadly conserved family of NAD+-dependent protein deacetylases. To further this, CobB is found in the Sir2 Family protein deacetylase, which is in control of energy metabolism, chemotaxis, and DNA supercoiling in many bacteria.CobB does contain a sequence length of 235. It can be seen to be classified as a hydrolase protein.

In addition, CobB is responsible for the deacetylation of acetyl CoA synthetase (Acs), at which an active store lysine stimulates enzymatic activity. However, it is observed that the acetyl-CoA proteins can be observed to contain different bonding groups. That being said it can be seen that they could contain non-cognate histones H4 substrate. Similar to archaeal and eukaryotic sirtuin structures, it can contain a zinc-binding domain, which is an important feature in substrate-specific binding by sirtuin structures. Hence making the difference between prokaryotic and eukaryotic cell identification no longer accessible by simply viewing if the cells contain a zinc-bonding domain. When comparing CobB and Histone H4 complex with other sirtuin proteins in complex with acetyl-CoA, it is seen that contacts to the acetyl-lysine side-chain and beta-sheet interactions with residues directly C-terminal to the acetyl-lysine represent conserved features of sirtuin-substrate recognition. Seen to be done via an exothermic reaction. However, when looking at zinc substrate, when acetyl CoA synthetase binds to CobB it is seen to be an endothermic reaction, creating hydrophobic surface and/or structural rearrangement specifically involving substrate regions, distal to the acetyl-lysine binding site.

== Function ==
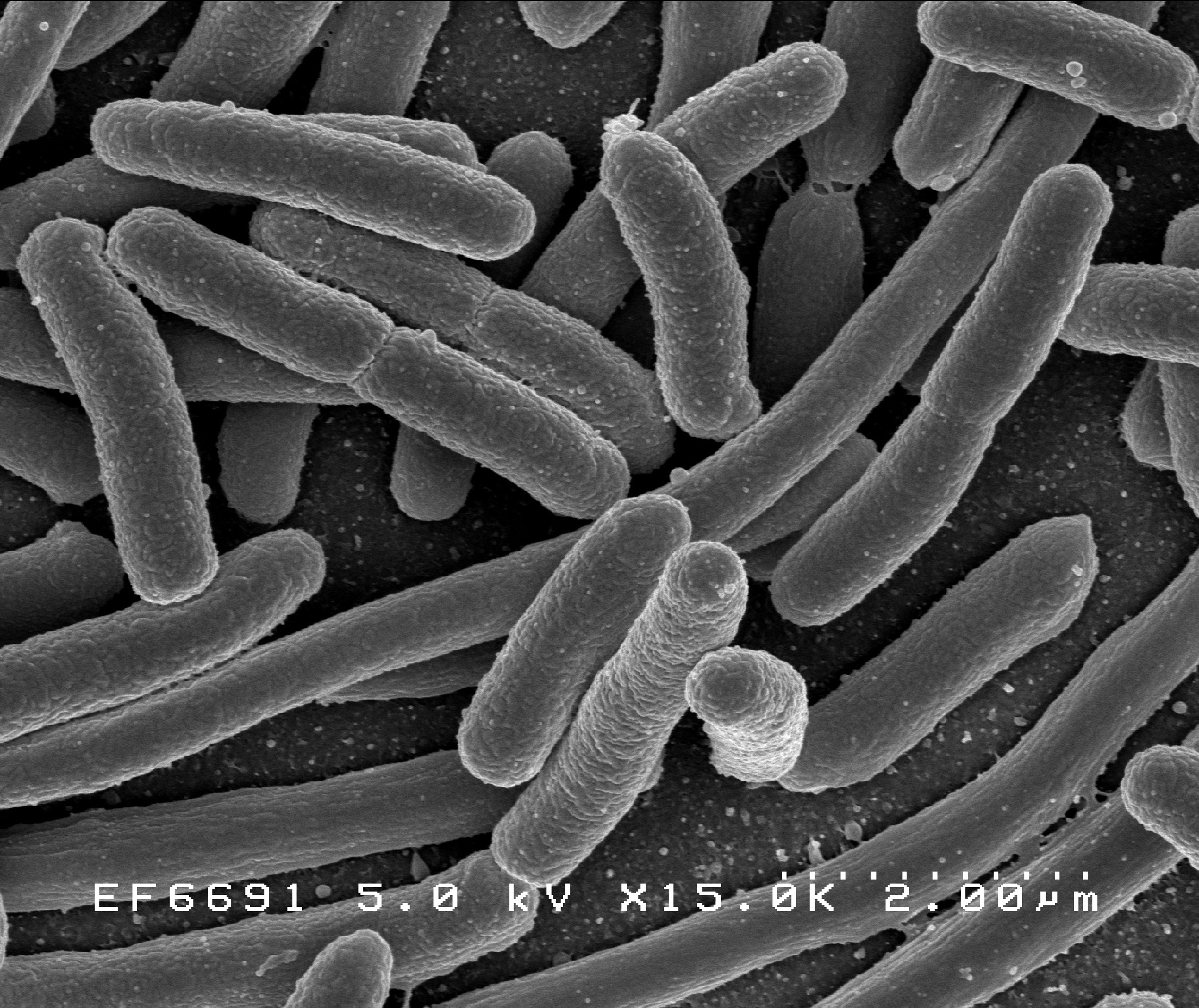
This is Escherichia coli, better known as E.coli. These bacteria can be found in the microbiome of organisms, seen in fecal matter, contaminated food or water, and even living within soils and plants. They are great organisms to study and observe, as without them we never would have known about the protein CobB.

Biochemically, protein acetylation is a process that is seen to be one of the most abundant post-translational modifications and allows for a critical role in many important biological processes. This contributes to the alteration of the protein by its properties, hydrophobicity, solubility, and surface properties. Yet with current advancements in mass spectroscopy, bacteria, specifically E. coli, have been found to contain many acetylated proteins and acetylation sites that have now been newly discovered. However, CobB has been the only protein deacetylase that has been discovered to date. Scientists are still researching the many protein deacetylases that can be found within bacteria.

Within Bacteria, they have responses towards toxins and antitoxins that trigger an onset of a persister state by inhibiting cellular processes. Presisters are seen to be a phenotypic variants that compose roughly one percent of the cells that consist of a stationary phase and biofilm cultures. This trait allows for a bacteria cell to be able to survive an antibiotic treatment. This is not a gene but actually a behavior that a bacteria possesses. Which makes it hard for scientists to study because of they are difficult to separate from each other from normal cells. TacT toxin seen within Salmonella enterica is known to allow for the induction of a persister state in macrophages. This is done via acetylation of aminoacyl-tRNAs. TacA antitoxin and TacT toxin work together as a complex that allows modulating TacT activity by the acetylation state of TacA. Now it does this acetylation at a of residue K44, in which a modification is removed by NAD+. Which is seen to be dependent on CobB sirtuin deacetylase. The functions of TacT and TacA acetylation, allow the bacteria to modulate their physiology to defend themselves against any attacks. For instance, changing their metabolism. Without CobB introducing the NAD+, the acetylation of TacA would not happen. Allowing for the bacteria to be not resilient enough against a host's immune system or any antibiotics that it may go against.

New research has just recently brought to life that YiaC and CobB have been in correlation to lysine lactylation (Kla). It has been observed through recent findings that lysine lactylation is responsible for the participation in regulating transcription throughout human cells in the body. Yet it is unclear on the characterization of the regulatory mechanisms and functional consequences of lysine lactylation in prokaryotes (bacteria) still remains unclear. However, it is seen that within the following research, YiaC serves as a lysine lactylase and CobB serves as a lysine deacetylase within the regulation of the metabolism. To add to this, YiaC catalyzes the addition of lysine lactylation, during which CobB erases the PTM in both virtro and intracellularly. The research found that ultimately 446 lysine lactylation sites were targeted by CobB and 79 sites were targeted by YiaC. All of which was seen in Escherichia coli (E. coli.). It can be also noted that lysine lactylation was also observed to affect metabolic enzymes. With that being said, CobB can specifically modulate the activity of PykF by regulating K382la, in which promotes glycolysis and bacterial growth. As the study furthered this and identified the regulating enzymes and functional network of lysine lactylation, as well as revealing that lysine lactylation mediated molecular mechanisms, which was catalyzed by CobB for glycolysis regulation in E.coli.

=== Hydroxyisobutyrylation ===
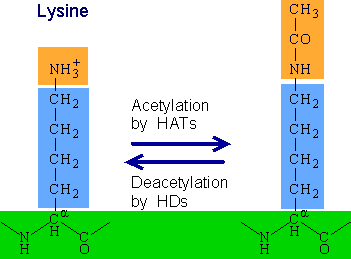
This shows that of the biochemical process in which Lysine is acetylated and as well as can be deacetylated. Lysine is an essential amino acid that plays an essential role within the body of humans. As it allows for proper growth, collagen production, production of carnitine, and much more!

Recent studies, and evolutionary advances seen within prokaryotes, show that CobB is an enzyme that removes a chemical modification called Khib ( de-2-hydroxyisobutyrylation) from lysine, an amino acid found in proteins. Khib is a type of histone mark that affects how DNA is packaged and expressed. CobB can also remove another modification called Kac (acetylation) from lysine. CobB binds to Khib using a special peptide probe and can change the activity of proteins involved in glycolysis, a process that breaks down sugar for energy. Researchers found that 99 endogenous substrates were targeted by CobB for de-2-hydroxyisobutyrylation. Researchers have demonstrated that CobB affects the growth of bacteria by altering the function of enolase (ENO), a key enzyme in glycolysis. It does so by removing K343hib and K326ac of ENO simultaneously. Come to find out CobB is the first enzyme known to remove Khib from proteins. This may change soon as research continues to explore more of CobB as well as the advancements within technology.

=== The binding of c-di-GMP ===
Additional research has found that c-di-GMP, a ubiquitous secondary messenger, has been found to strongly bind towards CobB. In bacteria, c-di-GMP plays a huge role in the means of bacterial motility and transcription regulation. Scientists used an Escherichia coli proteosome microarray to allow for this binding. When looking deeper, scientists saw that the protein deacetylation assays showed that c-di-GMP inhibits CobB activities and modulates the biogenesis of acetyl-CoA. Surprisingly, the production of c-di-GMP, seen within the bacteria, is done so by an enzyme called DgcZ. Which come to find out is a substrate of CobB. DgcZ deacetylation by CobB actually enhances its respective activities to further produce c-di-GMP. Scientists are still working on enhancing the negative feedback loop of both c-di-GMP biogenesis and CobB-mediated protein deacetylation.

=== Protein deacetylase ===
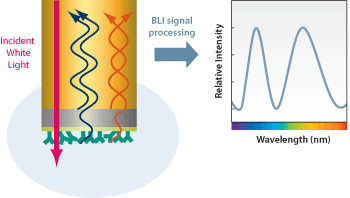
Bio-layer interferometry (BLI) is a label-free technology for measuring biomolecular interactions. It further analyzes the interference pattern of white light reflected from two surfaces. These surfaces consisting of an immobilized protein on the biosensor tip and an internal reference layer.

Scientists are currently still experimenting with identifying the many proteins that have been found in acetylated proteins and acetylation sites. A relatively recent study has used a proteome microarray containing roughly 4000 affinity-purified E. coli proteins to identify CobB interactors. These scientists found that 183 proteins binding proteins of high stringency, to have been seen. With further analysis, it showed that these interacting proteins had allowed for many roles, within a wide range of cellular functions and were highly enriched with the carboxylic acid metabolic process, as well as allowing for the hexose catabolic process. Not to mention that this was seen to be enriched in transferase and hydrolase. Scientists furthered their experiment by using bio-layer interferometry to analyze the interaction and quantify the kinetic parameters of putative CobB interactors. Clearly showing that CobB could strongly interact with TopA and AccC. This information is the starting point for research to come with CobB and the many other molecules seen to interact with it.

== Post-translational modification ==
=== N-terminal acetylation ===
Within eukaryotic cells, the N-terminal amino moiety is modified by N-acetyltransferases (NATs). The protein modification can allow for a targeted protein to fold and can be affected by the binding interactions. These interactions can include effects with allosteric effectors allowing substrate binding with the target protein, which can be seen to initiate protein degradation. As CobB can be seen as an example of a targeted protein. Scientists were able to extract CobB long isoform (CobBL), from the bacteria Salmonella enterica, which was N-terminally actelylated by a Yiac protein, found in the same bacteria. Results shown from vitro and vivo experiments further showed that the CobB long isoform was deacetylase activity was negatively affected when YiaC acetylated. Liquid chromatography further this conclusion of the results from the experiment.
