= MC3482 =

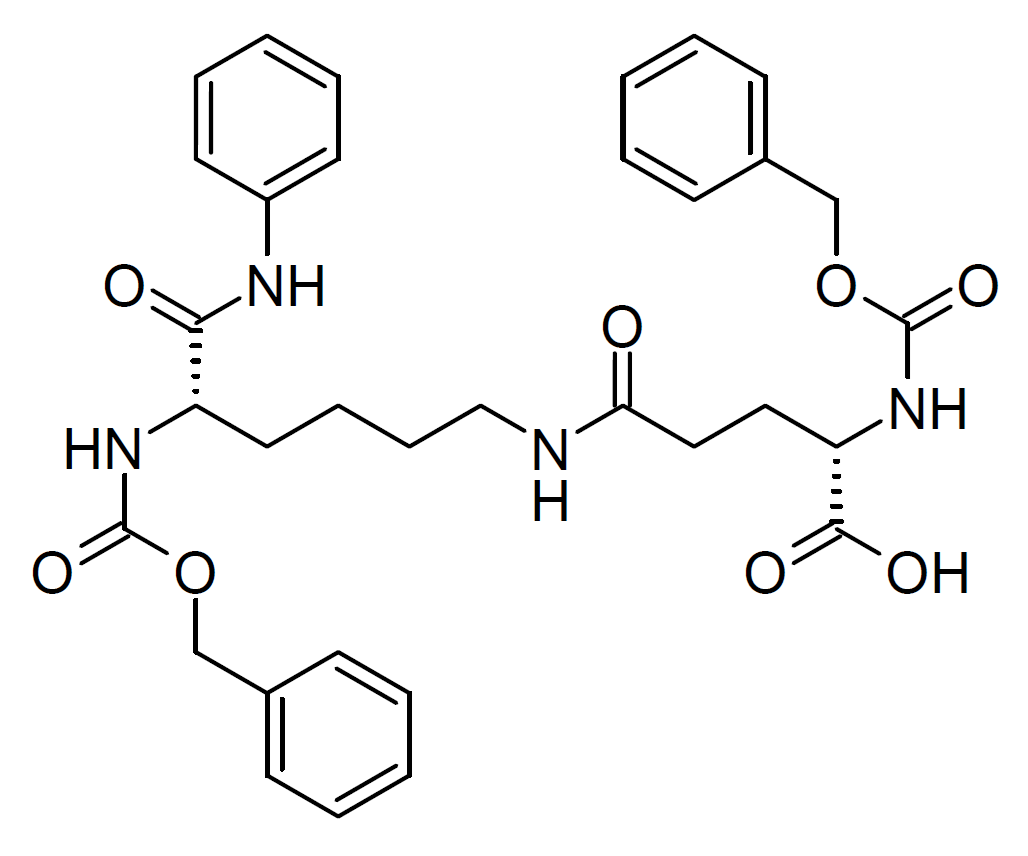

Clinical data
- Drug class: Sirtuin-5 (SIRT5) inhibitor

Identifiers
- IUPAC name: (2S)-5-[[(5S)-6-anilino-6-oxo-5-(phenylmethoxycarbonylamino)hexyl]amino]-5-oxo-2-(phenylmethoxycarbonylamino)pentanoic acid
- CAS Number: 2922280-86-0
- PubChem CID: 134694957
- ChemSpider: 71117562
- ChEMBL: ChEMBL5208157

Chemical and physical data
- Formula: C_{33}H_{38}N_{4}O_{8}
- Molar mass: 618.687 g·mol^{−1}
- 3D model (JSmol): Interactive image
- SMILES: C1=CC=C(C=C1)COC(=O)N[C@@H](CCCCNC(=O)CC[C@@H](C(=O)O)NC(=O)OCC2=CC=CC=C2)C(=O)NC3=CC=CC=C3
- InChI: InChI=1S/C33H38N4O8/c38-29(20-19-28(31(40)41)37-33(43)45-23-25-14-6-2-7-15-25)34-21-11-10-18-27(30(39)35-26-16-8-3-9-17-26)36-32(42)44-22-24-12-4-1-5-13-24/h1-9,12-17,27-28H,10-11,18-23H2,(H,34,38)(H,35,39)(H,36,42)(H,37,43)(H,40,41)/t27-,28-/m0/s1; Key:LDCYHYVNYRUUOL-NSOVKSMOSA-N

MC3482 is a drug which acts as a sirtuin-5 (SIRT5) inhibitor. It has antiinflammatory effects and is used for research into the function of the SIRT5 enzyme complex.
