= UBCS385 =

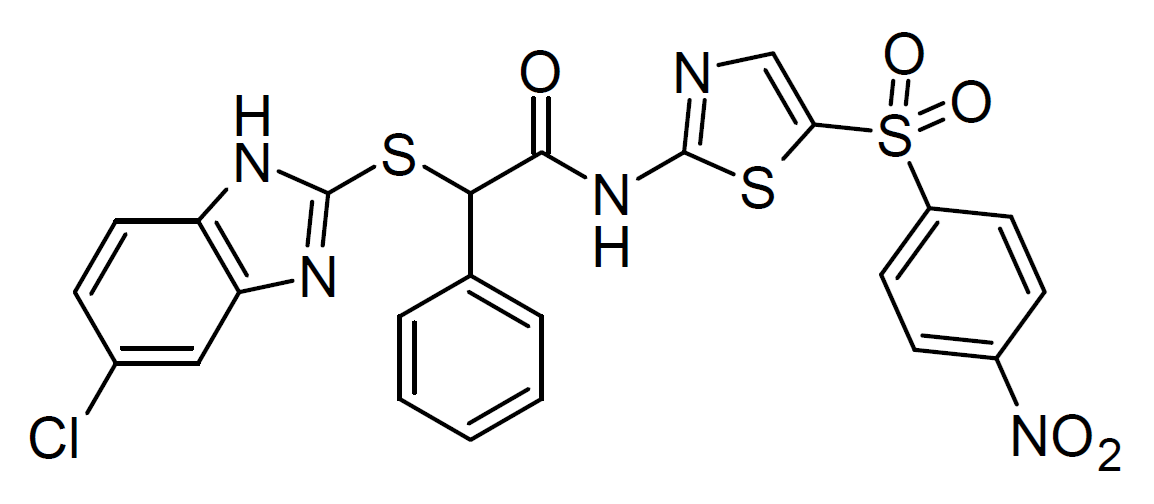

Clinical data
- Drug class: Sirtuin-4 (SIRT4) inhibitor

Identifiers
- IUPAC name: N-[5-(4-nitrophenyl-1-sulfonyl)-1,3-thiazol-2-yl]-2-[(5-chloro-1H-1,3-benzimidazol-2-yl)sulfanyl]-2-phenylacetamide

Chemical and physical data
- Formula: C_{24}H_{16}ClN_{5}O_{5}S_{3}
- Molar mass: 586.05 g·mol^{−1}
- 3D model (JSmol): Interactive image
- SMILES: c1cc(Cl)cc2c1NC(=N2)SC(c1ccccc1)C(=O)NC1=NC=C(S1)S(=O)(=O)c1ccc([N+](=O)[O+])cc1
- InChI: InChI=InChI=1S/C24H18ClN5O5S3/c25-15-6-11-18-19(12-15)28-24(27-18)37-21(14-4-2-1-3-5-14)22(31)29-23-26-13-20(36-23)38(34,35)17-9-7-16(8-10-17)30(32)33/h1-13,21H,32H2,(H,27,28)(H,26,29,31)/q+2; Key:BZKNNWDMWJKHJB-UHFFFAOYSA-N

UBCS385 is a drug which acts as a sirtuin-4 (SIRT4) inhibitor. It also inhibits SIRT2 with around the same affinity, but has reasonable selectivity over SIRT1, SIRT3, SIRT5 and SIRT6. As one of the first ligands developed that inhibits SIRT4 with high potency, UBCS385 is useful for basic research into the structure and function of the sirtuin-4 enzyme complex.
