= Sirtuin 4 =

Protein-coding gene in the species Homo sapiens

SIRT4

Identifiers
- Aliases: SIRT4, SIR2L4, sirtuin 4
- External IDs: OMIM: 604482; MGI: 1922637; GeneCards: SIRT4
Enzyme activity
EC #	BRENDA	ExPASy	KEGG	MetaCyc
2.3.1.286	↗	↗	↗	↗

Gene location (Human)
Chr.	Chromosome 12 (human)
Band	12q24.23-q24.31	Start	120,302,316 bp
Band	12q24.23-q24.31	End	120,313,249 bp

Gene location (Mouse)
Chr.	Chromosome 5 (mouse)
Band	5|5 F	Start	115,478,010 bp
Band	5|5 F	End	115,484,725 bp
RNA expression pattern
Bgee	Human / Mouse (ortholog); Top expressed in: testicle; apex of heart; muscle of thigh; gastrocnemius muscle; right adrenal gland; sperm; left ventricle; right adrenal cortex; left adrenal gland; left adrenal cortex / Top expressed in: neural layer of retina; primary visual cortex; superior frontal gyrus; right kidney; lip; spermatid; zygote; muscle of thigh; ventricular zone; seminiferous tubule; More reference expression data
BioGPS	n/a
Gene ontology
Molecular function	transferase activity; NAD-dependent protein deacetylase activity; metal ion binding; protein binding; NAD+ binding; lipoamidase activity; NAD+ ADP-ribosyltransferase activity; hydrolase activity; biotinidase activity; zinc ion binding
Cellular component	mitochondrion; mitochondrial inner membrane; mitochondrial matrix
Biological process	peptidyl-lysine deacetylation; negative regulation of insulin secretion; positive regulation of lipid biosynthetic process; protein ADP-ribosylation; regulation of glutamine family amino acid metabolic process; negative regulation of fatty acid oxidation; regulation of pyruvate dehydrogenase activity; cellular response to DNA damage stimulus; negative regulation of protein processing involved in protein targeting to mitochondrion; negative regulation of cardiac muscle cell apoptotic process; glutamine metabolic process; tricarboxylic acid metabolic process; cellular response to hypoxia; mitochondrion organization; protein deacetylation
Sources:Amigo / QuickGO
Orthologs
Databases	NCBI: entry; OMA: entry
Species	Human	Mouse
Entrez	23409	75387
Ensembl	ENSG00000089163	ENSMUSG00000029524
UniProt	Q9Y6E7	Q8R216
RefSeq (mRNA)	NM_012240; NM_001385733; NM_001385734; NM_001385735	NM_001167691; NM_133760
RefSeq (protein)	NP_036372	NP_001161163; NP_598521
Location (UCSC)	Chr 12: 120.3 – 120.31 Mb	Chr 5: 115.48 – 115.48 Mb
PubMed search
- Wikidata
View/Edit Human	View/Edit Mouse

Sirtuin 4, also known as SIRT4, is a mitochondrial protein which in humans is encoded by the SIRT4 gene. SIRT4 is member of the mammalian sirtuin family of proteins, which are homologs to the yeast Sir2 protein. SIRT4 exhibits NAD+-dependent deacetylase activity.

== Function ==
SIRT4 is a mitochondrial ADP-ribosyltransferase that inhibits mitochondrial glutamate dehydrogenase 1 activity, thereby downregulating insulin secretion in response to amino acids. A deacetylation of malonyl-CoA decarboxylase enzyme by SIRT4 represses the enzyme activity, inhibiting fatty acid oxidation in muscle and liver cells. SIRT4 has a suppressive effect on peroxisome proliferator-activated receptor alpha (PPAR-α) which downregulates fatty acid oxidation in liver cells. Deacetylation of ADP/ATP translocase 2 (ANT2) increases cellular ATP by dampening mitochondrial uncoupling.

== Clinical significance ==
SIRT4 is a mitochondrial tumor suppressor protein. Overexpression of SIRT4 inhibits cancer cell proliferation by inhibition of glutamine metabolism.

== Ligands ==
Inhibitors

- UBCS385
