= N-Acetylputrescine =

Endogenous GABA precursor

Names
- IUPAC name N-(4-aminobutyl)acetamide
- Other names Acetylputrescine; Monoacetylputrescine; NacPut

Identifiers
CAS Number	5699-41-2
3D model (JSmol)	Interactive image
ChEBI	CHEBI:17768
ChEMBL	ChEMBL81241
ChemSpider	109095
ECHA InfoCard	100.219.140
EC Number	691-457-0
KEGG	C02714
PubChem CID	122356
UNII	8FTM5ZL5A6
CompTox Dashboard (EPA)	DTXSID80205596
- InChI: InChI=1S/C6H14N2O/c1-6(9)8-5-3-2-4-7/h2-5,7H2,1H3,(H,8,9) Key: KLZGKIDSEJWEDW-UHFFFAOYSA-N
- SMILES: CC(=O)NCCCCN

Properties
Chemical formula	C_{6}H_{14}N_{2}O
Molar mass	130.19 g/mol
- Except where otherwise noted, data are given for materials in their standard state (at 25 °C [77 °F], 100 kPa). Infobox references

N-Acetylputrescine (NacPut), also known as monoacetylputrescine, is an endogenous metabolite of putrescine and a precursor and metabolic intermediate in the biosynthesis of γ-aminobutyric acid (GABA) from putrescine.

The metabolic pathway is specifically putrescine into N-acetylputrescine by putrescine acetyltransferase (PAT), N-acetylputrescine into N-acetyl-γ-aminobutyraldehyde (N-acetyl-GABAL or N-acetyl-GABA aldehyde) by monoamine oxidase B (MAO-B), N-acetyl-GABAL into N-acetyl-γ-aminobutyric acid (N-acetyl-GABA) by aldehyde dehydrogenase (ALDH), and N-acetyl-GABA into GABA by an unknown deacetylase enzyme. This pathway is a minor alternative pathway to the major and primary pathway in which GABA is synthesized from glutamate. There is also another alternative pathway in which putrescine is converted into GABA with γ-aminobutyraldehyde (GABAL or GABA aldehyde) as an intermediate instead. It has been estimated that about 2 to 3% of GABA is synthesized from putrescine in the mouse brain, whereas in the case of the rat brain, the amount was negligible.

In 2021, it was discovered that MAO-B does not mediate dopamine catabolism in the rodent striatum but instead participates in striatal GABA synthesis and that synthesized GABA in turn inhibits dopaminergic neurons in this brain area. It has been found that MAO-B, via the putrescine pathway, importantly mediates GABA synthesis in astrocytes in various brain areas, including in the hippocampus, cerebellum, striatum, cerebral cortex, and substantia nigra pars compacta (SNpc). These findings may warrant a rethinking of the actions of MAO-B inhibitors in the treatment of Parkinson's disease.
