= Sirtuin 5 =

Protein-coding gene in the species Homo sapiens

SIRT5
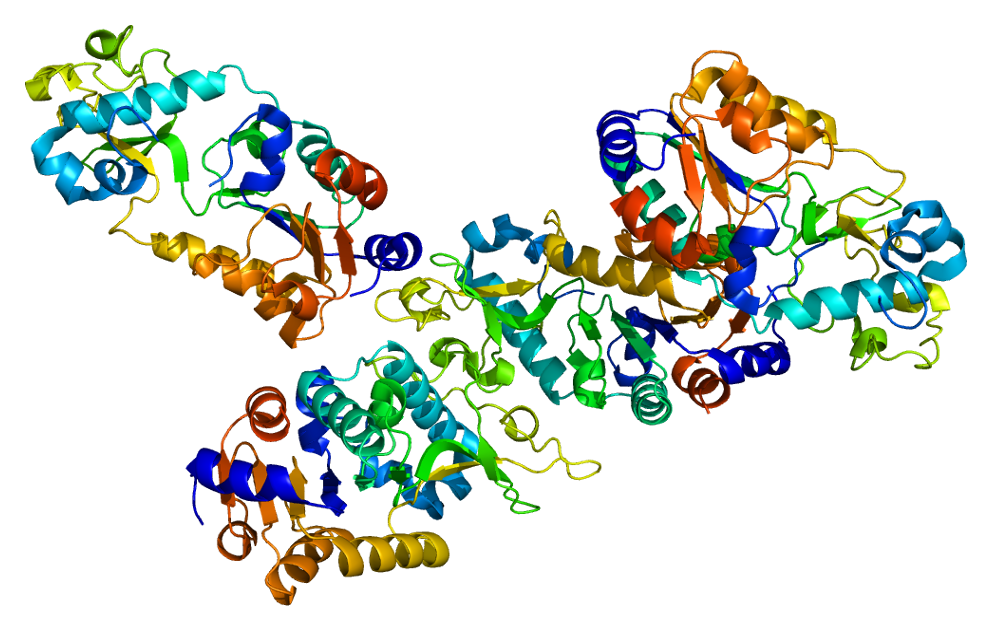

Identifiers
- Aliases: SIRT5, SIR2L5, sirtuin 5
- External IDs: OMIM: 604483; MGI: 1915596; GeneCards: SIRT5
Available structures
PDB	Ortholog search: PDBe RCSB
PDB	List of PDB id codes 2B4Y, 2NYR, 3RIG, 3RIY, 4F4U, 4F56, 4G1C, 4HDA, 5BWL

Gene location (Human)
Chr.	Chromosome 6 (human)
Band	6p23	Start	13,574,529 bp
Band	6p23	End	13,615,158 bp

Gene location (Mouse)
Chr.	Chromosome 13 (mouse)
Band	13|13 A4	Start	43,518,972 bp
Band	13|13 A4	End	43,548,679 bp
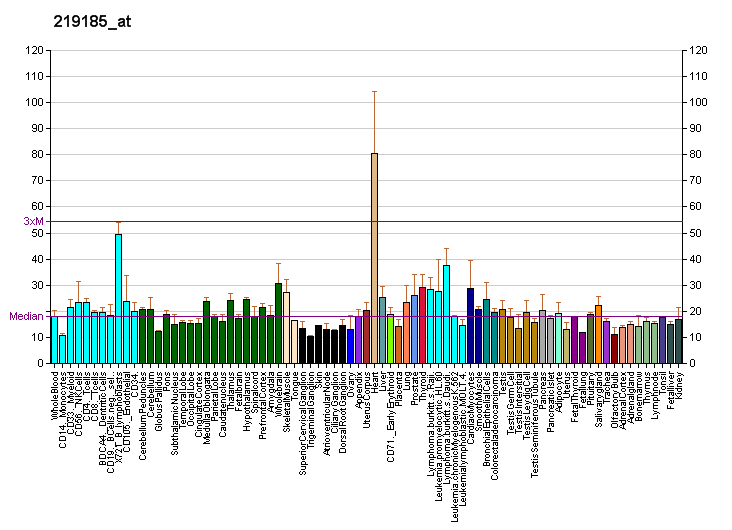

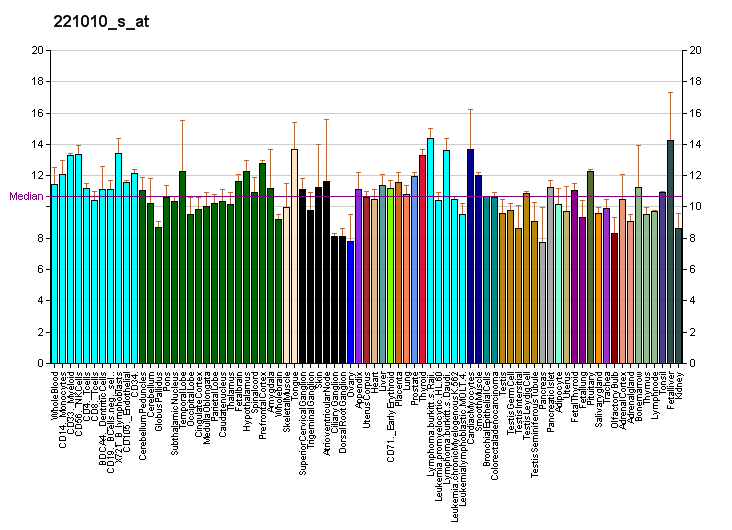
RNA expression pattern
Bgee	Human / Mouse (ortholog); Top expressed in: thoracic diaphragm; apex of heart; left ventricle; buccal mucosa cell; Skeletal muscle tissue of rectus abdominis; right lobe of liver; body of tongue; muscle of thigh; tendon of biceps brachii; biceps brachii / Top expressed in: interventricular septum; morula; extraocular muscle; myocardium of ventricle; left lobe of liver; soleus muscle; hand; digastric muscle; tibialis anterior muscle; quadriceps femoris muscle; More reference expression data
BioGPS	More reference expression data
Gene ontology
Molecular function	hydrolase activity; metal ion binding; NAD+ ADP-ribosyltransferase activity; NAD+ binding; protein-succinyllysine desuccinylase activity; protein-malonyllysine demalonylase activity; zinc ion binding; NAD-dependent protein deacetylase activity; protein-glutaryllysine deglutarylase activity
Cellular component	cytoplasm; mitochondrial intermembrane space; mitochondrion; nucleus; cytosol; mitochondrial matrix; mitochondrial inner membrane
Biological process	protein deacetylation; negative regulation of cardiac muscle cell apoptotic process; response to nutrient levels; protein ADP-ribosylation; negative regulation of reactive oxygen species metabolic process; peptidyl-lysine deglutarylation; mitochondrion organization; regulation of ketone biosynthetic process; protein demalonylation; peptidyl-lysine demalonylation; protein desuccinylation; peptidyl-lysine desuccinylation; protein deglutarylation
Sources:Amigo / QuickGO
Orthologs
Databases	NCBI: entry; OMA: entry
Species	Human	Mouse
Entrez	23408	68346
Ensembl	ENSG00000124523	ENSMUSG00000054021
UniProt	Q9NXA8	Q8K2C6
RefSeq (mRNA)	NM_001193267; NM_001242827; NM_012241; NM_031244	NM_178848
RefSeq (protein)	NP_001180196; NP_001229756; NP_036373; NP_112534; NP_001363727 NP_001363728; NP_001363729; NP_001363730; NP_001363731; NP_001363732; NP_001363733; NP_001363734; NP_001363735; NP_001363736; NP_001363737; NP_001363738; NP_001363739; NP_001363740; NP_001363741; NP_001363742; NP_001363743; NP_001363744	NP_849179
Location (UCSC)	Chr 6: 13.57 – 13.62 Mb	Chr 13: 43.52 – 43.55 Mb
PubMed search
- Wikidata
View/Edit Human	View/Edit Mouse

Sirtuin (silent mating type information regulation 2 homolog) 5 (S. cerevisiae), also known as SIRT5, is a protein which in humans in encoded by the SIRT5 gene and in other species by the orthologous Sirt5 gene.

This gene encodes a member of the sirtuin family of proteins, homologs to the yeast Sir2 protein. Members of the sirtuin family are characterized by a sirtuin core domain and belong to the class III of the [histone deacetylase] superfamily, and are dependent on NAD+ as co-factor of enzymatic activities. SIRT5 is one of the three sirtuins localized primarily to the mitochondrion.

== Structure ==
Alternative splicing of this gene results in two transcript variants. The protein structure of SIRT5 has been resolved and shows high degrees of structural conservation with other sirtuins, such as the ancestral yeast protein and human SIRT2.

== Function ==
SIRT5 has been found to exhibit enzymatic activities as a deacetylase, desuccinylase, and demalonylase, capable of removing acetyl, succinyl, and malonyl groups from the lysine residues of proteins. SIRT5 deacetylases and regulates carbamoyl phosphate synthetase (CPS1), the rate-limiting and initiating step of the urea cycle in liver mitochondria. Deacetylation of CPS1 stimulates its enzymatic activity. Mice with deletion of SIRT5 show elevated ammonia levels after a prolonged fast, whereas in contrast, mice overexpressing SIRT5 show increased CPS1 activity, suggesting one of the functions of SIRT5 may be to regulate the urea cycle. SIRT5 also interacts with and deacetylates cytochrome c. Large-scale profiling studies of SIRT5 deacetylase activity have uncovered over 700 protein substrates, including proteins localized to the mitochondria, the cytosol and other sub cellular localization. The identities of SIRT5 desuccinylation substrates suggest that SIRT5-mediated desuccinylation may be involved in energy metabolism.

The physiological consequences of SIRT5 molecular functions in human is under investigation but may involved regulations of mitochondrial metabolism.

== Interactions ==
NAD+

Cytochrome c

Carbamoyl phosphate synthetase (CPS1)

== Ligands ==
Activators

- MC3138

Inhibitors

- MC3482
