= Sirtuin =

Enzyme

Sir2 family
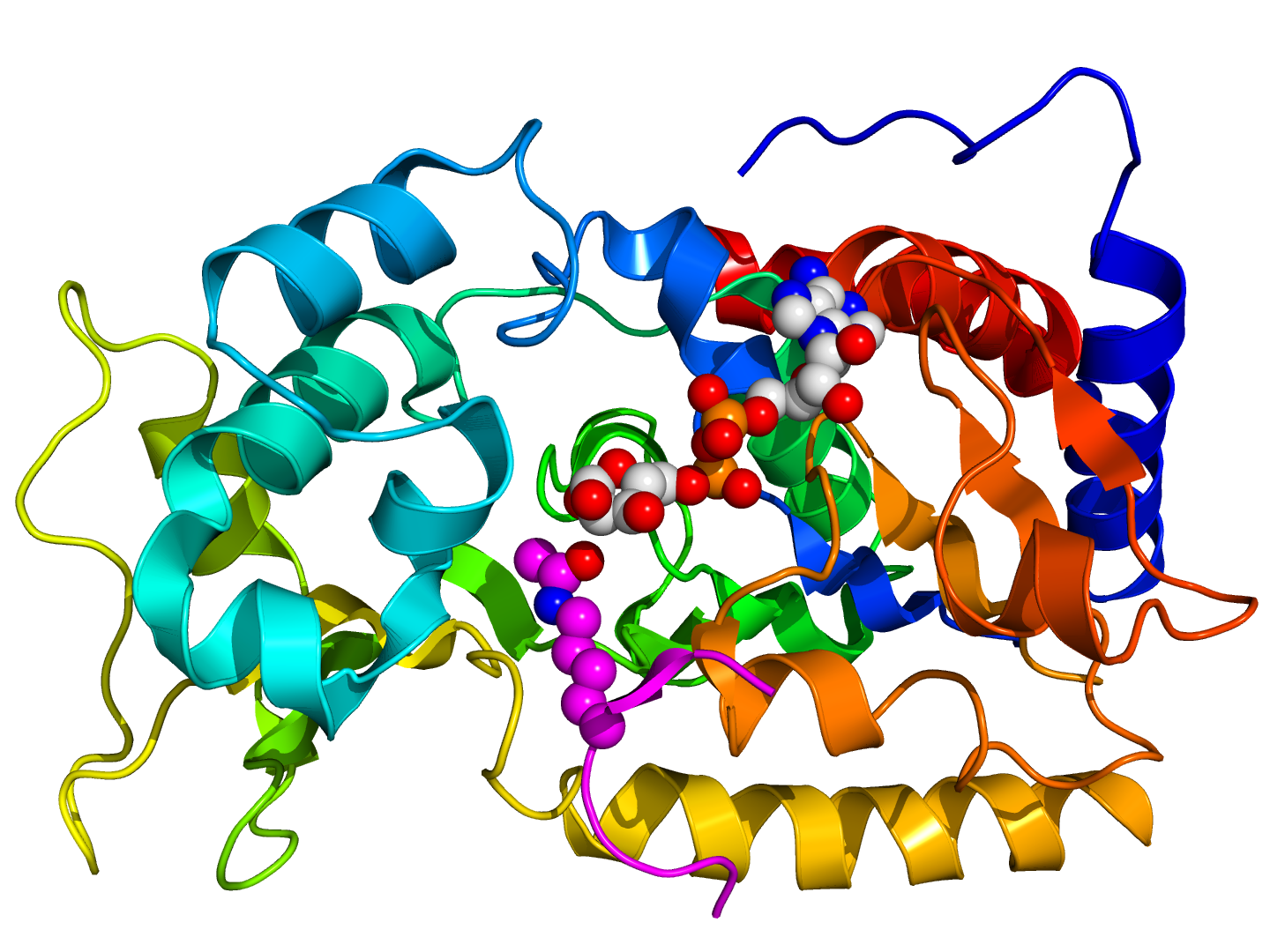
- Crystallographic structure of yeast sir2 (rainbow colored cartoon, N-terminus = blue, C-terminus = red) complexed with ADP (space-filling model, carbon = white, oxygen = red, nitrogen = blue, phosphorus = orange) and a histone H4 peptide (magenta) containing an acylated lysine residue (displayed as spheres)

Identifiers
- Symbol: SIR2
- Pfam: PF02146
- Pfam clan: CL0085
- InterPro: IPR003000
- PROSITE: PS50305
- SCOP2: 1j8f / SCOPe / SUPFAM
Available protein structures:
- PDB: 1ici, 1j8f, 1m2g, 1m2h, 1m2j, 1m2k, 1m2n, 1ma3, 1q14, 1q17, 1q1a, 1s5p, 1s7g, 1szc, 1szd, 1yc2, 1yc5 IPR003000 PF02146 (ECOD; PDBsum)
- AlphaFold: IPR003000; PF02146

Sirtuins are a family of signaling proteins involved in metabolic regulation. They are ancient in animal evolution and appear to possess a highly conserved structure throughout all kingdoms of life. Chemically, sirtuins are a class of proteins that possess either mono-ADP-ribosyltransferase or deacylase activity, including deacetylase, desuccinylase, demalonylase, demyristoylase and depalmitoylase activity. The name Sir2 comes from the yeast gene 'silent mating-type information regulation 2', the gene responsible for cellular regulation in yeast.

Yeast Sir2 and some, but not all, sirtuins are protein deacetylases. Unlike other known protein deacetylases, which simply hydrolyze acetyl-lysine residues, the sirtuin-mediated deacetylation reaction couples lysine deacetylation to NAD+ hydrolysis. This hydrolysis yields O-acetyl-ADP-ribose, the deacetylated substrate and nicotinamide, which is an inhibitor of sirtuin activity itself.

Sirtuins that deacetylate histones are structurally and mechanistically distinct from other classes of histone deacetylases (classes I, IIA, IIB and IV), which have a different protein fold and use Zn^{2+} as a cofactor.

== Actions and species distribution ==
Sirtuins are a family of signaling proteins involved in metabolic regulation. They are ancient in animal evolution and appear to possess a highly conserved structure throughout all kingdoms of life. Whereas bacteria and archaea encode either one or two sirtuins, eukaryotes encode several sirtuins in their genomes. In yeast, roundworms, and fruitflies, sir2 is the name of one of the sirtuin-type proteins (see table below). Mammals possess seven sirtuins (SIRT1–7) that occupy different subcellular compartments: SIRT1, SIRT6 and SIRT7 are predominantly in the nucleus, SIRT2 in the cytoplasm, and SIRT3, SIRT4 and SIRT5 in the mitochondria.

== History ==
Research on sirtuin protein was started in 1991 by Leonard Guarente of MIT. Interest in the metabolism of NAD^{+} heightened after the year 2000 discovery by Shin-ichiro Imai and coworkers in the Guarente laboratory that sirtuins are NAD+-dependent protein deacetylases .

== Types ==
The first sirtuin was identified in yeast (a fungus) and named sir2. In more complex mammals, there are seven known enzymes that act in cellular regulation, as sir2 does in yeast. These genes are designated as belonging to different classes (I-IV), depending on their amino acid sequence structure. Several gram-positive prokaryotes as well as the gram-negative hyperthermophilic bacterium Thermotoga maritima possess sirtuins that are intermediate in sequence between classes, and these are placed in the "undifferentiated" or "U" class. In addition, several gram-positive bacteria, including Staphylococcus aureus and Streptococcus pyogenes, as well as several fungi carry macrodomain-linked sirtuins (termed "class M" sirtuins).

Class	Subclass	Species				Intracellular location	Activity	Cellular function	Catalytic domains	Histone deacetylation target	Non-histone deacetylation target	Pathology
Class	Subclass	Bacteria	Yeast	Mouse	Human	Intracellular location	Activity	Cellular function	Catalytic domains	Histone deacetylation target	Non-histone deacetylation target	Pathology
I	a		Sir2, Hst1	Sirt1	SIRT1	Nucleus, cytoplasm	Deacetylase	Metabolism inflammation	244-498 (of 766aa)	H3K9ac, H1K26ac, H4K16ac	Hif-1α, HIF-2α, MYC, P53, BRCA1, FOXO3A, MyoD, Ku70, PPARγ, PCAF, Suv39h1, TGFB1, WRN, NBS1	Neurodegenerative diseases, Cancer: acute myeloid leukemia, colon, prostate, ovarian, glioma, breast, melanoma, lung adenocarcinoma
I	b		Hst2	Sirt2	SIRT2	Nucleus and cytoplasm	Deacetylase	Cell cycle, tumorigenesis	65-340 (of 388aa)	H3K56ac, H4K16ac	Tubulin, Foxo3a, EIF5A, P53, G6PD, MYC	Neurodegenerative diseases, Cancer: brain tissue, glioma
I	b			Sirt3	SIRT3	Mitochondria	Deacetylase	Metabolism	126-382 (of 399aa)	H3K56ac, H4K14ac	SOD2, PDH, IDH2, GOT2, FoxO3a	Neurodegenerative diseases, Cancer: B cell chronic lymphocytic leukemia, mantle cell lymphoma, chronic lymphocytic leukemia, breast, gastric
I	c		Hst3, Hst4									
II				Sirt4	SIRT4	Mitochondria	ADP-ribosyl transferase	Insulin secretion	45-314 (of 314aa)	Unknown	GDH, PDH	Cancer: breast, colorectal
III				Sirt5	SIRT5	Mitochondria	Demalonylase, desuccinylase and deacetylase	Ammonia detoxification	41-309 (of 310aa)	Unknown	CPS1	Cancer: pancreatic, breast, non-small cell lung carcinoma
IV	a			Sirt6	SIRT6	Nucleus	Demyristoylase, depalmitoylase, ADP-ribosyl transferase and deacetylase	DNA repair, metabolism, TNF secretion	35-274 (of 355aa)	H3K9ac, H3K56ac	Unknown	Cancer: breast, colon
IV	b			Sirt7	SIRT7	Nucleolus	Deacetylase	rRNA transcription	90-331 (of 400aa)	H3K18ac	Hif-1α, HIF-2α	Cancer: liver, testis, spleen, thyroid, breast
U		cobB					Regulation of acetyl-CoA synthetase	metabolism				
M		SirTM					ADP-ribosyl transferase	ROS detoxification				

SIRT3, a mitochondrial protein deacetylase, plays a role in the regulation of multiple metabolic proteins like isocitrate dehydrogenase of the TCA cycle. It also plays a role in skeletal muscle as a metabolic adaptive response. Since glutamine is a source of α-ketoglutarate used to replenish the TCA cycle, SIRT4 is involved in glutamine metabolism.

== Ageing ==
Although preliminary studies with resveratrol, an activator of deacetylases such as SIRT1, led some scientists to speculate that resveratrol may extend lifespan, no clinical evidence for such an effect has been discovered, as of 2018.

== Tissue fibrosis ==
A 2018 review indicated that SIRT levels are lower in tissues from people with scleroderma, and such reduced SIRT levels may increase risk of fibrosis through modulation of the TGF-β signaling pathway.

== DNA repair in laboratory studies ==
SIRT1, SIRT6 and SIRT7 proteins are employed in DNA repair. SIRT1 protein promotes homologous recombination in human cells and is involved in recombinational repair of DNA breaks.

SIRT6 is a chromatin-associated protein and in mammalian cells is required for base excision repair of DNA damage. SIRT6 deficiency in mice leads to a degenerative aging-like phenotype. In addition, SIRT6 promotes the repair of DNA double-strand breaks. Furthermore, over-expression of SIRT6 can stimulate homologous recombinational repair.

SIRT7 knockout mice display features of premature aging. SIRT7 protein is required for repair of double-strand breaks by non-homologous end joining.

== Inhibitors ==
Certain sirtuin activity is inhibited by nicotinamide, which binds to a specific receptor site. It is an inhibitor in vitro of SIRT1, but can be a stimulator in cells.

== Activators ==
List of known sirtuin activator in vitro
Compound	Target/Specificity	References
Piceatannol	SIRT1	
SRT-1720	SIRT1	
SRT-2104	SIRT1	
Beta-Lapachone	SIRT1	
Cilostazol	SIRT1	
Quercetin and rutin derivatives	SIRT6	
Luteolin	SIRT6	
Fisetin	SIRT6	
Phenolic acid	SIRT6	
Fucoidan	SIRT6	
Curcumin	SIRT1, SIRT6	
Pirfenidone	SIRT1	
Myricetin	SIRT6	
Cyanidin	SIRT6	
Delphinidin	SIRT6	
Apigenin	SIRT6	
Butein	SIRT6	
Isoliquiritigenin	SIRT6	
Ferulic acid	SIRT1	
Berberine	SIRT1	
Catechin	SIRT1	
Malvidin	SIRT1	
Pterostilbene	SIRT1	
Tyrosol	SIRT1	

== See also ==
- Biological immortality
- Histone deacetylases or HDACs
- Trichostatin A
