= Sirtuin 7 =

Protein-coding gene in the species Homo sapiens

SIRT7

Identifiers
- Aliases: SIRT7, SIR2L7, sirtuin 7
- External IDs: OMIM: 606212; MGI: 2385849; GeneCards: SIRT7
Enzyme activity
EC #	BRENDA	ExPASy	KEGG	MetaCyc
2.3.1.286	↗	↗	↗	↗

Gene location (Human)
Chr.	Chromosome 17 (human)
Band	17q25.3	Start	81,911,939 bp
Band	17q25.3	End	81,921,323 bp

Gene location (Mouse)
Chr.	Chromosome 11 (mouse)
Band	11|11 E2	Start	120,509,198 bp
Band	11|11 E2	End	120,516,066 bp
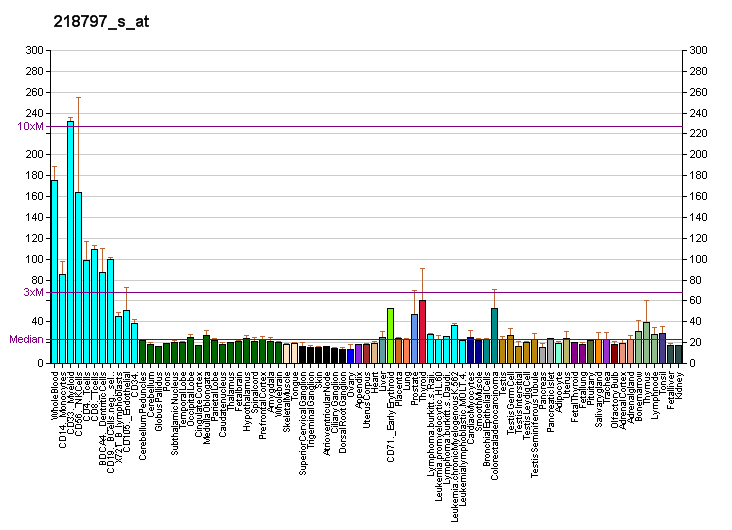
RNA expression pattern
Bgee	Human / Mouse (ortholog); Top expressed in: mucosa of transverse colon; granulocyte; monocyte; secondary oocyte; blood; mucosa of pharynx; body of stomach; spleen; skin of leg; right hemisphere of cerebellum / Top expressed in: granulocyte; mesenteric lymph nodes; otic vesicle; thymus; spleen; right kidney; left lobe of liver; intestinal villus; bone marrow; proximal tubule; More reference expression data
BioGPS	More reference expression data
Gene ontology
Molecular function	chromatin binding; protein binding; NAD-dependent histone deacetylase activity (H3-K18 specific); hydrolase activity; metal ion binding; NAD+ binding; histone deacetylase activity
Cellular component	cytoplasm; nucleolus organizer region; nucleolus; nucleus
Biological process	histone H3 deacetylation; rRNA transcription; positive regulation of transcription involved in exit from mitosis; negative regulation of transcription by RNA polymerase II; regulation of transcription, DNA-templated; transcription, DNA-templated; histone H4 deacetylation; chromatin organization
Sources:Amigo / QuickGO
Orthologs
Databases	NCBI: entry; OMA: entry
Species	Human	Mouse
Entrez	51547	209011
Ensembl	ENSG00000187531	ENSMUSG00000025138
UniProt	Q9NRC8	Q8BKJ9
RefSeq (mRNA)	NM_016538	NM_153056; NM_001363439
RefSeq (protein)	NP_057622	NP_694696; NP_001350368
Location (UCSC)	Chr 17: 81.91 – 81.92 Mb	Chr 11: 120.51 – 120.52 Mb
PubMed search
- Wikidata
View/Edit Human	View/Edit Mouse

NAD-dependent deacetylase sirtuin 7 is an enzyme that in humans is encoded by the SIRT7 gene. SIRT7 is member of the mammalian sirtuin family of proteins, which are homologs to the yeast Sir2 protein.

== Function ==
SIRT7 facilitates the transcription of DNA by RNA polymerase I, RNA polymerase II, and RNA polymerase III.

In human cells, SIRT7 has only been shown to interact with two other molecules: RNA polymerase I (RNA Pol I) and upstream binding factor (UBF). SIRT7 is localized to the nucleolus and interacts with RNA Pol I. Chromatin immunoprecipitation studies demonstrate that SIRT7 localizes to rDNA, and coimmunoprecipitation shows that SIRT7 binds RNA Pol I. In addition SIRT7 interacts with UBF, a major component of the RNA Pol I initiation complex. It is not known whether or not SIRT7 is modifying RNA Pol I and/or UBF, and if so, what those modifications are.

SIRT7 is expressed more in metabolically active tissues, such as liver and spleen, and less in non-proliferating tissues, such as heart and brain. Furthermore, it has been shown that SIRT7 is necessary for rDNA transcription. Knock down of SIRT7 in HEK293 cells resulted in decreased rRNA levels. This same study found that this SIRT7 knockdown decreased the amount of RNA Pol I associated with rDNA, suggesting that SIRT7 may be required for rDNA transcription. Knock down SIRT7 led to reduced RNA Pol I levels, but RNA Pol I mRNA levels did not change. This suggests that SIRT7 plays a crucial role in connecting the function of chromatin remodeling complexes to RNA Pol I machinery during transcription.

SIRT7 may help attenuate DNA damage and thereby promoting cellular survival under conditions of genomic stress. Ribosomal DNA (rDNA) is more vulnerable to DNA damage than DNA elsewhere in the genome such that rDNA instability can lead to cellular senescence, and thus to senescence-associated secretory phenotype. SIRT7 localizes to rDNA thereby protecting against rDNA instability and cellular senescence.

=== DNA repair ===
Depletion of SIRT7 results in impaired repair of DNA double-strand breaks (DSBs) by the process of non-homologous end joining (NHEJ). DSBs are one of the most significant types of DNA damage leading to genome instability. SIRT7 is recruited to DSBs where it specifically deacylates histone H3 at lysine 18. This affects the focal accumulation of the DNA damage response factor 53BP1, a protein that promotes NHEJ by protecting DNA from end resection. SIRT7 is recruited to DSBs by poly (ADP-ribose) polymerase (PARP).

SIRT7 overexpression has been shown to improve efficiency of NHEJ by 1.5-fold, and of homologous recombination by 2.8-fold.

=== Accelerated aging ===
Sirt7 mutant mice show phenotypic and molecular features of accelerated aging. These features include premature curvature of the spine, reduced weight and fat content, compromised hematopoietic stem cell function and leukopenia, and multiple organ dysfunction. Because SIRT7 facilitates DNA repair, and because DNA damage results in aging phenotypes, defects in SIRT7 results in premature aging.

== Clinical relevance ==
This gene has been found to be involved in maintenance of oncogenic transformation.
