= Macro domain =

Macro
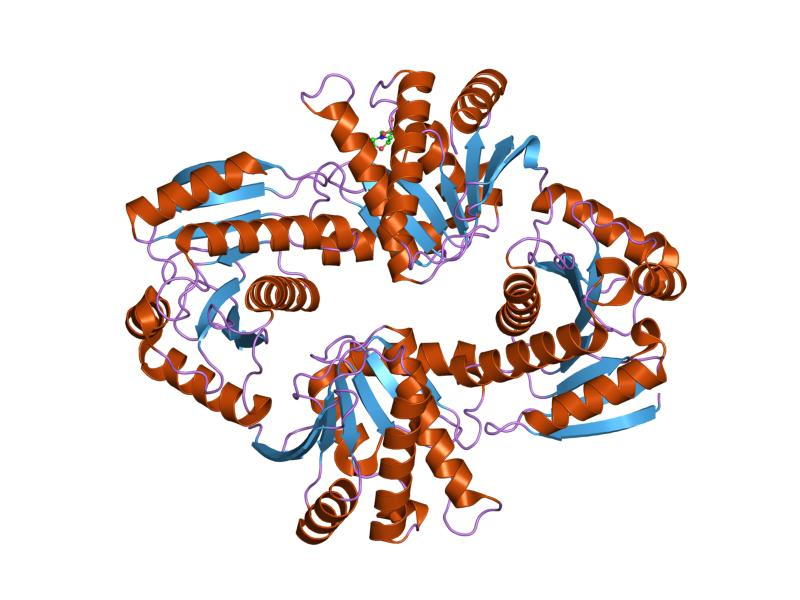
- Crystal structure of the macro-domain of human core histone variant macroh2a1.1

Identifiers
- Symbol: Macro
- Pfam: PF01661
- Pfam clan: CL0223
- InterPro: IPR002589
- SCOP2: 1vhu / SCOPe / SUPFAM
- CDD: cd02749
Available protein structures:
- PDB: IPR002589 PF01661 (ECOD; PDBsum)
- AlphaFold: IPR002589; PF01661

In molecular biology, the Macro domain (often also written macrodomain) or A1pp domain is an ancient, evolutionary conserved structural module found in all kingdoms of life as well as some viruses. Macro domains are modules of about 180 amino acids that can bind ADP-ribose, an NAD metabolite, or related ligands. Binding to ADP-ribose can be either covalent or non-covalent: in certain cases it is believed to bind non-covalently, while in other cases (such as Aprataxin) it appears to bind both non-covalently through a zinc finger motif, and covalently through a separate region of the protein.

== Function ==
The domain was described originally in association with the ADP-ribose 1-phosphate (Appr-1-P)-processing activity (A1pp) of the yeast YBR022W protein and called A1pp. However, the domain has been renamed Macro as it is the C-terminal domain of mammalian core histone macro-H2A. Macro domain proteins can be found in eukaryotes, in (mostly pathogenic) bacteria, in archaea and in ssRNA viruses, such as coronaviruses, Rubella and Hepatitis E viruses. In vertebrates the domain occurs in e.g. histone macroH2A, predicted poly-ADP-ribose polymerases (PARPs) and B aggressive lymphoma (BAL) protein. Zinc-containing macro domains (Zn-Macros) are primarily encountered in pathogenic microorganisms and have structurally distinct features from other macro domains, which include their function being strictly dependent on a catalytic zinc within the active site.

ADP-ribosylation of proteins is an important post-translational modification that occurs in a variety of biological processes, including DNA repair, regulation of transcription, chromatin biology, maintenance of genomic stability, telomere dynamics, cell differentiation and proliferation, necrosis and apoptosis, and long-term memory formation. The Macro domain recognises the ADP-ribose nucleotide and in some cases poly-ADP-ribose, and is thus a high-affinity ADP-ribose-binding module found in a number of otherwise unrelated proteins.

ADP-ribosylation of DNA is relatively uncommon and has only been described for a small number of toxins that include pierisin, scabin and DarT. The Macro domain from the antitoxin DarG of the toxin-antitoxin system DarTG, both binds and removes the ADP-ribose modification added to DNA by the toxin DarT. The Macro domain from human, macroH2A1.1, binds an NAD metabolite O-acetyl-ADP-ribose.

Class	Subclass	Species	Activity
MacroH2A-like		e	ADP-ribose binding
MacroD-type	'classic'	a, b, e, v	ADP-ribosyl bond hydrolysis
MacroD-type	Zn-dependent	b, e	ADP-ribosyl bond hydrolysis
MacroD-type	GDAP2-like	e	ADP-ribose binding
ALC1-like		b, e	ADP-ribose binding or ADP-ribosyl bond hydrolysis
PARG-like	PARG_cat	e	ADP-ribosyl bond hydrolysis
PARG-like	mPARG (DUF2263)	b, e, v	ADP-ribosyl bond hydrolysis
Macro2-type		e, v	ADP-ribosyl bond hydrolysis
SUD-M-like		v	RNA binding
DUF2362		e	unknown
a, Archaea; b, Bacteria; e, Eukarya; v, Virus

== Structure ==
The 3D structure of the Macro domain describes a mixed alpha/beta fold of a mixed beta sheet sandwiched between four helices with the ligand-binding pocket lies within the fold. Several Macro domain-only domains are shorter than the structure of AF1521 and lack either the first strand or the C-terminal helix 5. Well conserved residues form a hydrophobic cleft and cluster around the AF1521-ADP-ribose binding site.

== See also ==
- ADP-ribosylation
