= SMG5 =

Protein-coding gene in humans

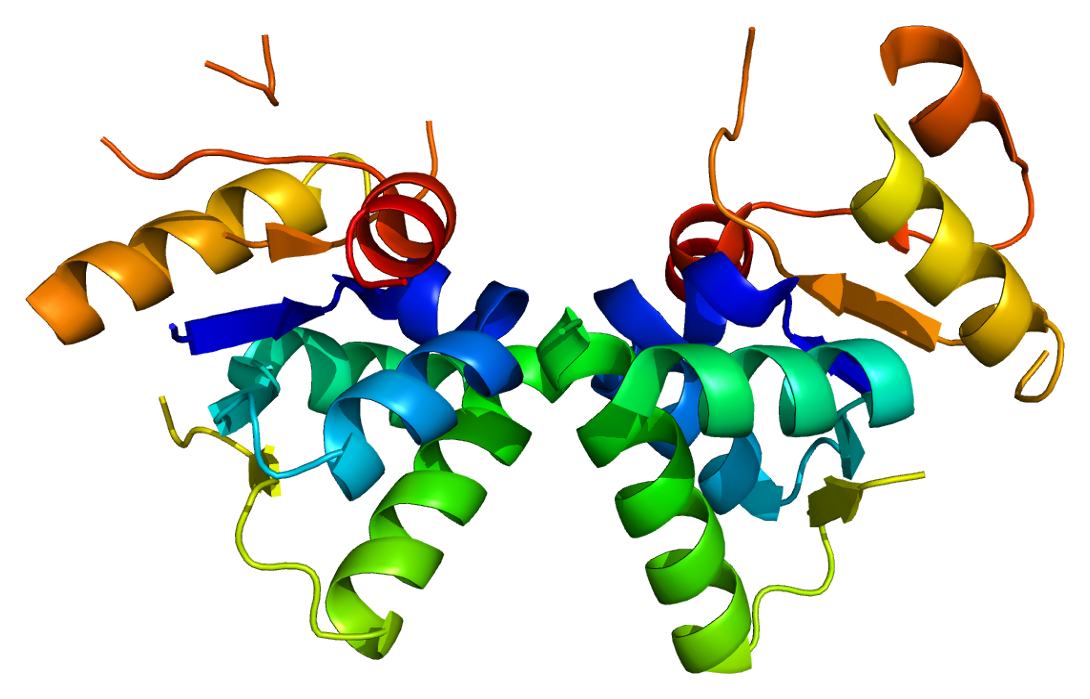

Identifiers
- Aliases: SMG5, EST1B, LPTS-RP1, LPTSRP1, SMG-5, nonsense mediated mRNA decay factor, SMG5 nonsense mediated mRNA decay factor
- External IDs: OMIM: 610962; MGI: 2447364; GeneCards: SMG5
Available structures
PDB	Ortholog search: PDBe RCSB
PDB	List of PDB id codes 2HWY

Gene location (Human)
Chr.	Chromosome 1 (human)
Band	1q22	Start	156,249,224 bp
Band	1q22	End	156,282,825 bp

Gene location (Mouse)
Chr.	Chromosome 3 (mouse)
Band	3|3 F1	Start	88,243,567 bp
Band	3|3 F1	End	88,269,645 bp
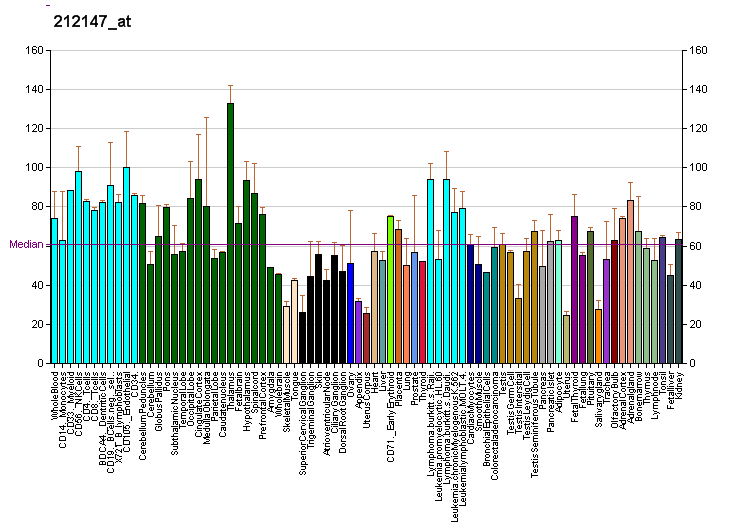

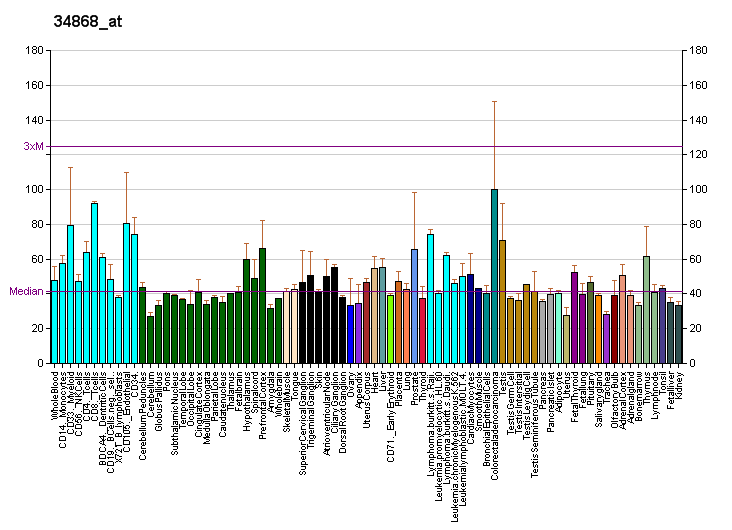
RNA expression pattern
Bgee	Human / Mouse (ortholog); Top expressed in: apex of heart; gastrocnemius muscle; anterior pituitary; right adrenal gland; granulocyte; right hemisphere of cerebellum; C1 segment; right adrenal cortex; left adrenal cortex; skin of leg / Top expressed in: spermatocyte; spermatid; superior frontal gyrus; neural layer of retina; ventricular zone; lip; muscle of thigh; seminiferous tubule; dentate gyrus of hippocampal formation granule cell; tail of embryo; More reference expression data
BioGPS	More reference expression data
Gene ontology
Molecular function	protein phosphatase 2A binding; histone deacetylase binding; protein binding; telomeric DNA binding; ubiquitin protein ligase binding; ribonuclease activity; ribonucleoprotein complex binding; telomerase RNA binding
Cellular component	cytoplasm; cytosol; nucleus; telomerase holoenzyme complex
Biological process	regulation of dephosphorylation; nuclear-transcribed mRNA catabolic process, nonsense-mediated decay; mRNA export from nucleus; regulation of telomere maintenance; regulation of telomere maintenance via telomerase; regulation of RNA stability; RNA phosphodiester bond hydrolysis; telomere maintenance via telomerase
Sources:Amigo / QuickGO
Orthologs
Databases	NCBI: entry; OMA: entry
Species	Human	Mouse
Entrez	23381	229512
Ensembl	ENSG00000198952	ENSMUSG00000001415
UniProt	Q9UPR3	Q6ZPY2
RefSeq (mRNA)	NM_015327; NM_001323614; NM_001323615; NM_001323616; NM_001323617	NM_173188; NM_178246
RefSeq (protein)	NP_001310543; NP_001310544; NP_001310545; NP_001310546; NP_056142	NP_839977
Location (UCSC)	Chr 1: 156.25 – 156.28 Mb	Chr 3: 88.24 – 88.27 Mb
PubMed search
- Wikidata
View/Edit Human	View/Edit Mouse

Protein SMG5 is a protein that in humans is encoded by the SMG5 gene. This protein contains a PIN domain that appears to have mutated the residues in the active site.
