= Non-histone protein =

Class of proteins

In chromatin, those proteins which remain after the histones have been removed, are classified as non-histone proteins. The non-histone proteins, are a large group of heterogeneous proteins that play a role in organization and compaction of the chromosome into higher order structures. They play vital roles in regulating processes like nucleosome remodeling, DNA replication, RNA synthesis and processing, nuclear transport, steroid hormone action and interphase/mitosis transition. Scaffold proteins, DNA polymerase, Heterochromatin Protein 1 and Polycomb are common non-histone proteins. This classification group also includes numerous other structural, regulatory, and motor proteins. Non-histone proteins are acidic.

The methylation of non-histone proteins regulates responses to DNA damage including the modulation of DNA repair pathways in proliferating and post-mitotic neuronal cells. Such modulation likely has implications for neuronal function.

== See also ==
- Chromatin
- Cohesin
- Condensin

== Sources ==
Hartwell, Leland; L. Hood; M. Goldberg; A. Reynolds; L. Silver; R. Veres (2004). Genetics: From Genes to Genomes. New York, NY: McGraw-Hill. pp. 417–422. ISBN 0-07-246248-5.
