= MC3138 =

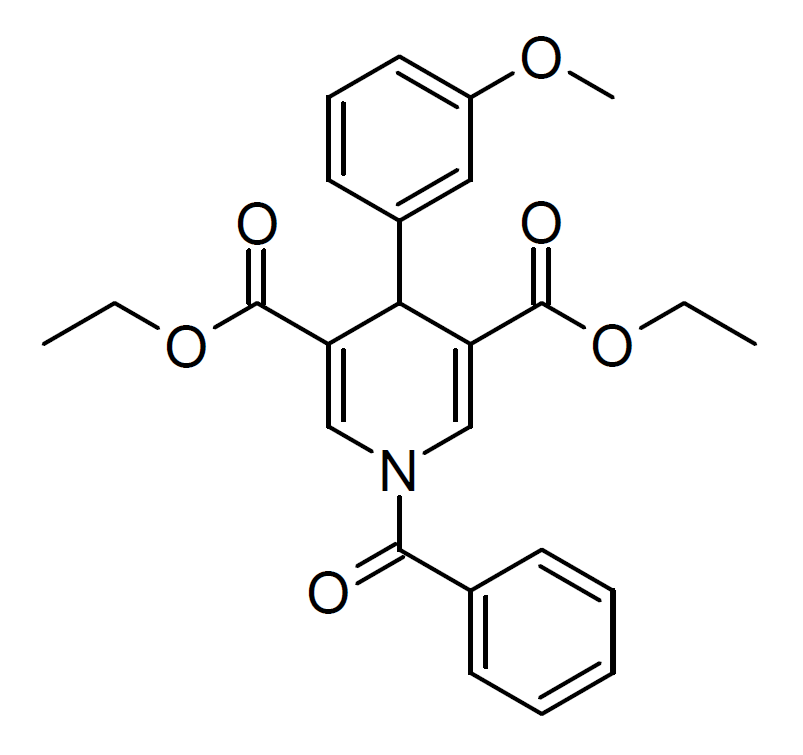

Clinical data
- Drug class: Sirtuin-5 (SIRT5) activator

Identifiers
- IUPAC name: diethyl 1-benzoyl-4-(3-methoxyphenyl)-4H-pyridine-3,5-dicarboxylate
- CAS Number: 1844889-12-8
- PubChem CID: 155524917
- ChemSpider: 127420243
- ChEMBL: ChEMBL4455257

Chemical and physical data
- Formula: C_{25}H_{25}NO_{6}
- Molar mass: 435.476 g·mol^{−1}
- 3D model (JSmol): Interactive image
- SMILES: CCOC(=O)C1=CN(C=C(C1C2=CC(=CC=C2)OC)C(=O)OCC)C(=O)C3=CC=CC=C3
- InChI: InChI=1S/C25H25NO6/c1-4-31-24(28)20-15-26(23(27)17-10-7-6-8-11-17)16-21(25(29)32-5-2)22(20)18-12-9-13-19(14-18)30-3/h6-16,22H,4-5H2,1-3H3; Key:WDDDSHYKJNGLJR-UHFFFAOYSA-N

MC3138 is a drug which acts as a sirtuin-5 (SIRT5) activator. It has potential applications in the treatment of pancreatic cancer, as well as basic research into the function of the SIRT5 enzyme complex.
