= Diamine N-acetyltransferase =

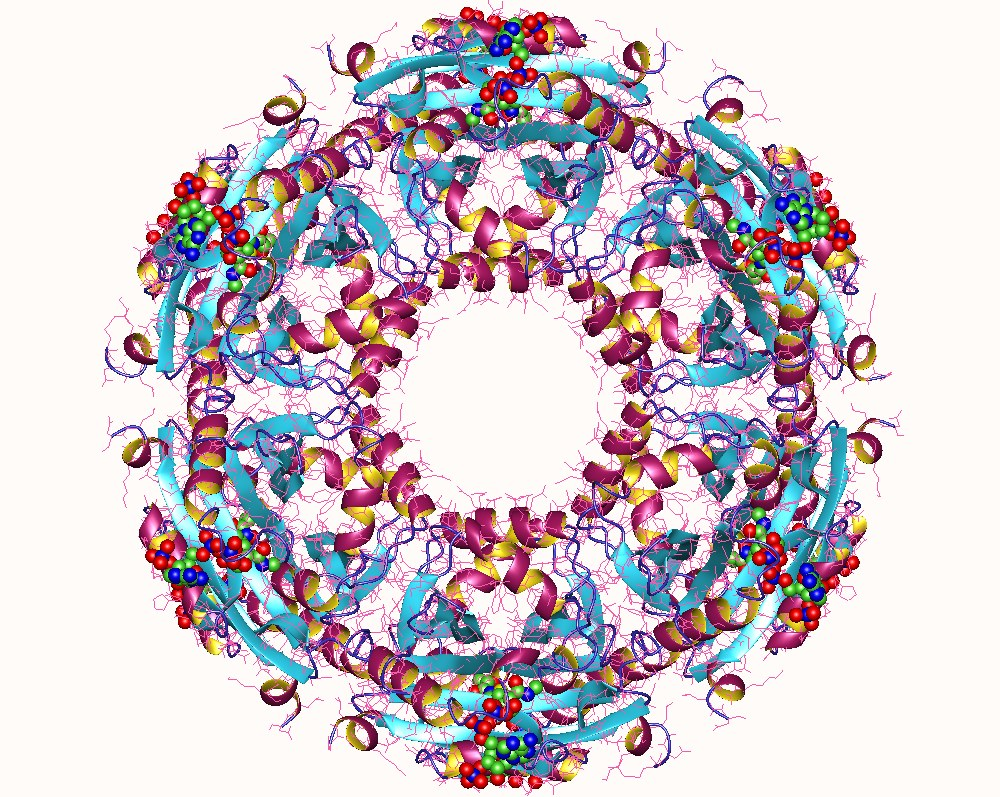
- Spermidine N-acetyltransferase dodekamer, Vibrio cholerae

Identifiers
- EC no.: 2.3.1.57
- CAS no.: 54596-36-0

Databases
- IntEnz: IntEnz view
- BRENDA: BRENDA entry
- ExPASy: NiceZyme view
- KEGG: KEGG entry
- MetaCyc: metabolic pathway
- PRIAM: profile
- PDB structures: RCSB PDB PDBe PDBsum
- Gene Ontology: AmiGO / QuickGO
Search
- PMC: articles
- PubMed: articles
- NCBI: proteins

Diamine N-acetyltransferase (EC 2.3.1.57) is an enzyme that catalyzes the general chemical reaction

an alkane-alpha,omega-diamine + acetyl-CoA $\rightleftharpoons$ an N-acetyldiamine + CoA

Putrescine is a typical example of a substrate for the enzyme and in this case the product is N-acetylputrescine:

Putrescine
+
acetyl-CoA
N-Acetylputrescine
+ coenzyme A

The enzyme was characterised from rat liver and belongs to the family of transferases, specifically those acyltransferases transferring groups other than aminoacyl groups. The systematic name of this enzyme class is acetyl-CoA:alkane-alpha,omega-diamine N-acetyltransferase. Other names in common use include spermidine acetyltransferase, putrescine acetyltransferase, putrescine (diamine)-acetylating enzyme, diamine acetyltransferase, spermidine/spermine N1-acetyltransferase, spermidine N1-acetyltransferase, acetyl-coenzyme A-1,4-diaminobutane N-acetyltransferase, putrescine acetylase, and putrescine N-acetyltransferase. This enzyme participates in urea cycle and metabolism of amino groups.

== Structural studies ==
As of late 2007, 12 structures have been solved for this class of enzymes, with PDB accession codes 2B3U, 2B3V, 2B4B, 2B4D, 2B58, 2B5G, 2BEI, 2F5I, 2FXF, 2G3T, 2JEV, and 2Q4V.
