= Protein deacetylase =

Class of enzymes

A protein deacetylase is any enzyme that removes acetyl groups from lysine amino acids in proteins. That is, it performs deacetylation.

The main ones are histone deacetylases (HDACs) and sirtuins (SIRT1,2,3,5).

Because histone proteins were the first known substrate for protein deacetylases, the latter all tend to be called HDACs of one class or another.

Human protein deacetylase enzymes have been categorized into

- Class I (HDAC1,2,3,8);
- Class II (HDAC4,5,6,7,9,10),
- Class III (SIRT1,2,3,5,6),
- Class IV (HDAC11 and its related enzymes).

Class III are the NAD+-dependent protein deacetylases.
