= Nicotinate riboside kinase =

Identifiers
- EC no.: 2.7.1.173

Databases
- BRENDA: enzyme data
- ExPASy: NiceZyme view
- KEGG: enzyme entry
- MetaCyc: metabolic pathway
- Rhea: reactions
- PDB structures: RCSB PDB PDBe PDBsum
Search
- PMC: articles
- PubMed: articles
- NCBI: proteins

Nicotinate riboside kinase (EC 2.7.1.173, ribosylnicotinic acid kinase, nicotinic acid riboside kinase, NRK1) is an enzyme that in humans is encoded by the genes NMRK1 and NMRK2. Its systematic name ATP:beta-D-ribosylnicotinate 5-phosphotransferase, and it catalyses the following chemical reaction:

ATP +
D-ribosylnicotinate
ADP +
nicotinate mononucleotide

This enzyme found in yeasts and humans converts D-ribosylnicotinate to nicotinate mononucleotide by transferring a phosphate group from the cofactor, adenosine triphosphate (ATP), which is converted to adenosine diphosphate (ADP). This is part of the biosynthetic pathway to nicotinamide adenine dinucleotide. An alternative substrate for the enzyme is nicotinamide riboside, similar to the enzyme ribosylnicotinamide kinase.
