= NAD-II riboswitch =

NAD-II riboswitch aptamer
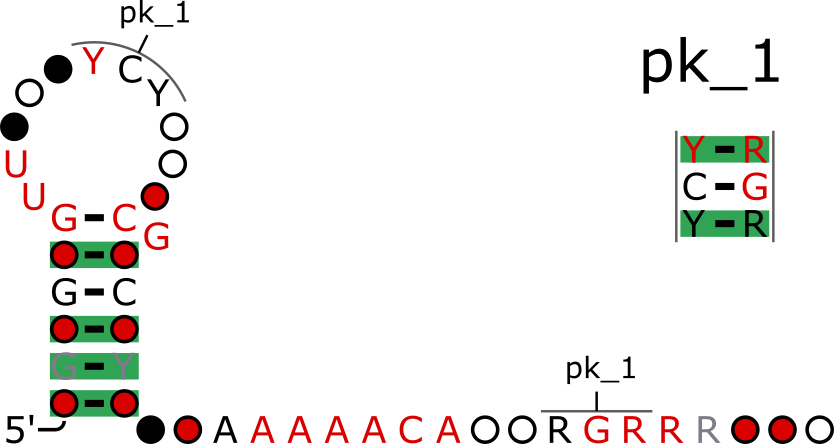
- Consensus secondary structure and sequence conservation of NAD-II

Identifiers
- Symbol: NAD-II
- Rfam: RF04326

Other data
- RNA type: riboswitch; cis-reg
- GO: GO:0010468
- SO: SO:0000035
- PDB structures: PDBe 8HB1 8HB3 8HB8 8I3Z

The NAD⁺-II riboswitch (also called the pnuC RNA motif) is a riboswitch found in bacteria that regulates gene expression in response to levels of nicotinamide adenine dinucleotide (NAD⁺) and related metabolites, particularly nicotinamide mononucleotide (NMN) and nicotinamide riboside (NR). A shorter variant, the mini-NAD⁺-II riboswitch, was described in 2025 and is more phylogenetically widespread than the original class.

== Overview ==
NAD⁺ is a ubiquitous enzyme cofactor that functions as a carrier of hydride ions in metabolic oxidation-reduction reactions. It also serves as a source of activated adenosine monophosphate (AMP) for adenylation reactions and as a precursor of ADP-ribose. Because of NAD⁺'s essential role in cellular metabolism, bacteria must carefully regulate genes involved in both the de novo biosynthesis and salvage (recycling) of NAD⁺ and its many derivatives. Two classes of NAD riboswitches have been identified: NAD-I and NAD⁺-II.

=== NAD-I Riboswitch ===
The NAD-I riboswitch (also called the nadA motif) was identified in species of the bacterial phylum Acidobacteriota, where it typically resides upstream of nadA genes encoding quinolate synthase, an enzyme in the de novo NAD⁺ biosynthesis pathway. Unusually, despite regulating genes relevant to NAD⁺ metabolism, neither binding domain of the NAD⁺-I riboswitch's dual-aptamer architecture has been shown to specifically recognize the nicotinamide portion of the coenzyme; instead, the RNA robustly binds the adenosine 5′-diphosphate (ADP) moiety of NAD⁺.

=== NAD-II Riboswitch ===
The NAD⁺-II riboswitch was first described as the pnuC RNA motif, discovered via computational searches for long GC-rich intergenic regions in bacterial genomes. The original consensus model consists of two base-paired stems (P1 and P1a) separated by a conserved internal loop, with a three-nucleotide segment predicted to form a pseudoknot by base-pairing with a portion of the Shine-Dalgarno sequence of the adjacent open reading frame. Its structure was subsequently confirmed by X-ray crystallography. In contrast to the NAD⁺-I class, NAD⁺-II riboswitches specifically and robustly recognize the oxidized form of the nicotinamide moiety either as part of NMN, NR, or intact NAD⁺. The original examples were found exclusively in the genus Streptococcus, where these riboswitches regulate pnuC genes encoding an NR/NMN transporter.

In contrast to the NAD⁺-I class, NAD⁺-II riboswitches specifically and robustly recognize the oxidized form of the nicotinamide moiety either as part of NMN, NR, or intact NAD⁺. The original 43 examples were found exclusively in the genus Streptococcus, where these riboswitches regulate pnuC genes encoding an NR/NMN transporter.

=== Mini-NAD-II Riboswitches ===
A NAD⁺-II class riboswitch, termed mini-NAD⁺-II, was first identified through iterative covariance model (CM) searches against representative bacterial genomes in the Genome Taxonomy Database. Mini-NAD⁺-II riboswitches lack the P1a stem and instead fold into a simple H-type pseudoknot, a compact RNA tertiary structure. The conserved nucleotides essential for tertiary contacts and specific recognition of the NMN moiety are retained, as is an A-rich tract following the P1 stem that likely forms a minor groove triplex.

Mini-NAD⁺-II riboswitches lack the P1a stem and instead fold into a simple H-type pseudoknot, a compact RNA tertiary structure. The conserved nucleotides essential for tertiary contacts and specific recognition of the NMN moiety are retained, as is an A-rich tract following the P1 stem that likely forms a minor groove triplex. The potential for base pairing with the adjacent Shine–Dalgarno sequence is also retained, suggesting a conserved mechanism of translational regulation.

== Structure and ligand binding ==
The H-type pseudoknot core of mini-NAD⁺-II aptamers is structurally analogous to that of the preQ1-I riboswitch class, one of the smallest known natural riboswitch aptamers. Both classes represent the shortest known natural RNA aptamers, yet achieve high ligand-binding specificity. This structural similarity suggests that simple H-type pseudoknots may function as versatile scaffolds for constructing ligand-binding aptamers, either naturally or synthetically. Biochemical analysis using in-line probing confirmed that mini-NAD⁺-II RNAs bind both NAD⁺ and NMN, with strong preference for NMN.

Biochemical analysis using in-line probing confirmed that mini-NAD⁺-II RNAs bind both NAD⁺ and NMN, with strong preference for NMN.

Mini-NAD⁺-II aptamers discriminate more strongly between NMN and NAD⁺ than the larger P1a containing aptamers, likely because they lack the conserved adenosines flanking P1a that make non-specific contacts with the adenosine moiety of NAD⁺. Gene Regulation

NAD⁺-II and mini-NAD⁺-II riboswitches are predicted to function as translational "OFF" switches: when NAD⁺ or NMN concentrations are sufficiently high, the riboswitch ligand-bound conformation sequesters the Shine-Dalgarno sequence within a pseudoknot, preventing ribosome binding and repressing translation of the downstream gene.

The downstream genes regulated by NAD⁺-II and mini-NAD⁺-II riboswitches include:

- pnuC a NR/NMN transporter (most common; majority of Lactobacillales examples)
- nadA a Quinolate synthase (first committed step of de novo NAD⁺ biosynthesis; common in Planctomycetota)
- pncB a Nicotinate phosphoribosyltransferase (nicotinic acid salvage)
- ecf an ECF (energy-coupling factor) transporter cassette, likely involved in NAD⁺ homeostasis
- tsx a Nucleoside-specific channel

== Phylogenetic distribution ==
=== NAD⁺-II (P1a) ===
The larger NAD⁺-II aptamers with P1a are predominantly found in the genus Streptococcus and a handful of other Lactobacillales species, almost always upstream of pnuC genes.

=== Mini-NAD⁺-II ===
Mini-NAD⁺-II riboswitches are distributed across at least four bacterial phyla:

- Lactobacillales (order) as the most abundant; primarily upstream of pnuC, and sometimes pncB or pnuC–nadR operons. Notable organisms include species of Fructobacillus and many other lactic acid bacteria.
- Planctomycetota (phylum), commonly upstream of nadA.
- Pseudomonadota, found in Pseudomonas laurylsulfatiphila and related species, upstream of an annotated nucleoside transporter.
- Actinobacteriota, in isolated instances from metagenome-assembled genomes.

The prevalence of mini-NAD⁺-II riboswitches in lactic acid bacteria is thought to be functionally significant, as these organisms rely on various anaerobic fermentation strategies (e.g., lactic acid or ethanol production) to maintain a balanced NAD⁺/NADH ratio.

The prevalence of mini-NAD⁺-II riboswitches in lactic acid bacteria is thought to be functionally significant, as these organisms rely on various anaerobic fermentation strategies (e.g., lactic acid or ethanol production) to maintain a balanced NAD⁺/NADH ratio.
