= P7C3-A20 =

Names
- IUPAC name N-[3-(3,6-Dibromocarbazol-9-yl)-2-fluoropropyl]-3-methoxyaniline

Identifiers
CAS Number	1235481-90-9
3D model (JSmol)	Interactive image
ChEMBL	ChEMBL2442625
ChemSpider	30839242
PubChem CID	46853447
- InChI: InChI=1S/C22H19Br2FN2O/c1-28-18-4-2-3-17(11-18)26-12-16(25)13-27-21-7-5-14(23)9-19(21)20-10-15(24)6-8-22(20)27/h2-11,16,26H,12-13H2,1H3 Key: XNLTWMQBJFWQOU-UHFFFAOYSA-N
- SMILES: COC1=CC=CC(=C1)NCC(CN2C3=C(C=C(C=C3)Br)C4=C2C=CC(=C4)Br)F

Properties
Chemical formula	C_{22}H_{19}Br_{2}FN_{2}O
Molar mass	506.213 g·mol^{−1}
- Except where otherwise noted, data are given for materials in their standard state (at 25 °C [77 °F], 100 kPa). Infobox references

P7C3-A20 is a synthetic chemical compound belonging to the carbazole class. It was developed as a more potent analog of P7C3. It functions as an activator of nicotinamide phosphoribosyltransferase (NAMPT), the rate-limiting enzyme in the NAD^{+} salvage pathway. P7C3-A20 exhibits proneurogenic and neuroprotective properties in preclinical models, crossing the blood-brain barrier and demonstrating efficacy in various models of brain injury and neurodegeneration. Research has investigated its potential to treat Alzheimer's disease, where it reversed pathological features and restored cognitive function in mice. As of 2025, P7C3-A20 remains an experimental compound with no established clinical use in humans.

== Mechanism of action ==
P7C3-A20 acts as a small-molecule activator of NAMPT, enhancing the conversion of nicotinamide to nicotinamide mononucleotide (NMN), a precursor to NAD^{+}. This increases intracellular NAD^{+} levels, supporting cellular energy metabolism, mitochondrial function, and resistance to stress-induced cell death. Additional pathways reported in models include activation of PI3K/AKT/GSK3β signaling and restoration of NAD^{+} homeostasis without elevating NAD^{+} to supraphysiologic levels.

== Research ==
P7C3-A20 has shown efficacy in preclinical animal models, including:

- Traumatic brain injury (TBI): Repairs blood-brain barrier, arrests chronic neurodegeneration, and restores cognition even when administered one year post-injury.
- Hypoxic-ischemic encephalopathy: Neuroprotective via PI3K/AKT/GSK3β pathway.
- Alzheimer's disease models: Reverses tau phosphorylation, blood-brain barrier deterioration, oxidative stress, DNA damage, neuroinflammation; enhances neurogenesis and synaptic plasticity; achieves full cognitive recovery.
- Other models: Protects against ischemic stroke, optic nerve injury, intracerebral hemorrhage, and chemotherapy-induced peripheral neuropathy.
