= C24H29N3O2 =

The molecular formula C_{24}H_{29}N_{3}O_{2} (molar mass: 391.515 g/mol) may refer to:

- 1cP-LSD
- 1cP-MIPLA
- Daporinad
