= ST7-AS2 =

Non-coding RNA found in humans

Identifiers
- Aliases: ST7-AS2, ST7OT2, ST7 antisense RNA 2
- External IDs: GeneCards: ST7-AS2

Gene location (Human)
| Chr. | Chromosome 7 (human) |
| Band | 7q31.2 | Start | 117,072,072 bp |
| Band | 7q31.2 | End | 117,146,480 bp |
RNA expression pattern
| Bgee | Human / Mouse (ortholog); Top expressed in: sperm; testicle; epithelium of colon; Achilles tendon; bone marrow cell; sural nerve; right uterine tube; stromal cell of endometrium; left testis; right testis / n/a; More reference expression data |
| BioGPS | n/a |
Orthologs
| Databases | NCBI: entry; OMA: entry |
| Species | Human | Mouse |
| Entrez | 93654 | n/a |
| Ensembl | ENSG00000226367 | n/a |
| UniProt | n a | n/a |
| RefSeq (mRNA) | n/a | n/a |
| RefSeq (protein) | n/a | n/a |
| Location (UCSC) | Chr 7: 117.07 – 117.15 Mb | n/a |
| PubMed search | | n/a |
- Wikidata
| View/Edit Human |

ST7 antisense RNA 2 is a long non-coding RNA that in humans is encoded by the gene ST7-AS2. In humans, ST7-AS2 is found on chromosome 7 in a locus spanning a translocation breakpoint associated with autism. It is antisense to the ST7 gene.

== See also ==
- Long noncoding RNA
- ST7-AS1
