= ST7-OT4 =

Long non-coding RNA

Identifiers
- Aliases: ST7-OT4, NCRNA00042, ST7 overlapping transcript 4
- External IDs: GeneCards: ST7-OT4

Gene location (Human)
Chr.	Chromosome 7 (human)
Band	7q31.2	Start	116,953,899 bp
Band	7q31.2	End	117,098,806 bp
RNA expression pattern
Bgee	Human / Mouse (ortholog); Top expressed in: gonad; left testis; right testis; testicle; bone marrow cell; Achilles tendon; skeletal muscle tissue; sural nerve; epithelium of colon; corpus callosum / n/a; More reference expression data
BioGPS	n/a
Orthologs
Databases	NCBI: entry; OMA: entry
Species	Human	Mouse
Entrez	338069	n/a
Ensembl	ENSG00000214188	n/a
UniProt	n a	n/a
RefSeq (mRNA)	n/a	n/a
RefSeq (protein)	n/a	n/a
Location (UCSC)	Chr 7: 116.95 – 117.1 Mb	n/a
PubMed search		n/a
- Wikidata
View/Edit Human

In molecular biology, ST7 overlapping transcript 4 (non-protein coding), also known as ST7-OT4, is a long non-coding RNA. In humans, it is found on chromosome 7 in a locus spanning a translocation breakpoint associated with autism. It contains at least 7 exons and overlaps the ST7 gene.

== See also ==
- Long noncoding RNA
