= ST7-AS1 =

Long non-coding RNA

Identifiers
- Aliases: ST7-AS1, ST7OT1, ST7 antisense RNA 1
- External IDs: GeneCards: ST7-AS1

Gene location (Human)
Chr.	Chromosome 7 (human)
Band	7q31.2	Start	116,952,446 bp
Band	7q31.2	End	116,954,334 bp
RNA expression pattern
Bgee	Human / Mouse (ortholog); Top expressed in: olfactory zone of nasal mucosa; epithelium of colon; left lobe of thyroid gland; tibial arteries; gastric mucosa; right lobe of thyroid gland; right lung; ventricular zone; islet of Langerhans; right coronary artery / n/a; More reference expression data
BioGPS	n/a
Orthologs
Databases	NCBI: entry; OMA: entry
Species	Human	Mouse
Entrez	93653	n/a
Ensembl	ENSG00000227199	n/a
UniProt	n a	n/a
RefSeq (mRNA)	n/a	n/a
RefSeq (protein)	n/a	n/a
Location (UCSC)	Chr 7: 116.95 – 116.95 Mb	n/a
PubMed search		n/a
- Wikidata
View/Edit Human

In molecular biology, ST7 antisense RNA 1 (non-protein coding), also known as ST7-AS1, is a long non-coding RNA. In humans, it is found on chromosome 7 in a locus spanning a translocation breakpoint associated with autism. It is antisense to the ST7 gene.

== See also ==
- Long noncoding RNA
- ST7-AS2
