= Nicotinamide riboside kinase 1 =

Enzyme found in humans

NMRK1

Identifiers
- Aliases: NMRK1, C9orf95, NRK1, bA235O14.2, nicotinamide riboside kinase 1
- External IDs: OMIM: 608704; MGI: 2147434; GeneCards: NMRK1
Available structures
PDB	Ortholog search: PDBe RCSB
PDB	List of PDB id codes 2P0E, 2QG6, 2QL6, 2QSY, 2QSZ, 2QT0, 2QT1
Enzyme activity
EC #	BRENDA	ExPASy	KEGG	MetaCyc
2.7.1.22	↗	↗	↗	↗
2.7.1.173	↗	↗	↗	↗

Gene location (Human)
Chr.	Chromosome 9 (human)
Band	9q21.13	Start	75,060,573 bp
Band	9q21.13	End	75,088,217 bp

Gene location (Mouse)
Chr.	Chromosome 19 (mouse)
Band	19|19 B	Start	18,609,314 bp
Band	19|19 B	End	18,629,792 bp
RNA expression pattern
Bgee	Human / Mouse (ortholog); Top expressed in: parotid gland; body of pancreas; jejunal mucosa; mucosa of pharynx; right lobe of liver; oral cavity; right uterine tube; cerebellar hemisphere; mucosa of paranasal sinus; right hemisphere of cerebellum / Top expressed in: right kidney; proximal tubule; yolk sac; human kidney; granulocyte; lumbar spinal ganglion; spermatid; blastocyst; liver; muscle of thigh; More reference expression data
BioGPS	n/a
Gene ontology
Molecular function	transferase activity; nucleotide binding; protein binding; ATP binding; metal ion binding; kinase activity; ribosylnicotinamide kinase activity; ribosylnicotinate kinase activity; uridine kinase activity
Cellular component	cytosol
Biological process	pyridine nucleotide biosynthetic process; NAD biosynthetic process; phosphorylation; NAD metabolic process; UMP biosynthetic process
Sources:Amigo / QuickGO
Orthologs
Databases	NCBI: entry; OMA: entry
Species	Human	Mouse
Entrez	54981	225994
Ensembl	ENSG00000106733	ENSMUSG00000037847
UniProt	Q9NWW6	Q91W63
RefSeq (mRNA)	NM_001127603; NM_017881; NM_001330678; NM_001330679	NM_145497
RefSeq (protein)	NP_001121075; NP_001317607; NP_001317608; NP_060351	NP_663472
Location (UCSC)	Chr 9: 75.06 – 75.09 Mb	Chr 19: 18.61 – 18.63 Mb
PubMed search
- Wikidata
View/Edit Human	View/Edit Mouse

Nicotinamide riboside kinase 1 is an enzyme that in humans is encoded by the NMRK1 gene. As both a nicotinate riboside kinase (EC 2.7.1.173), and a ribosylnicotinamide kinase (EC 2.7.1.22), this enzyme helps perform a step in the process of converting certain forms of niacin/Vitamin B_{3} into active coenzymes like NAD^{+}. In humans, nicotinamide riboside kinase 1 is expressed in most tissues of the body, compared to the other isozyme, nicotinamide riboside kinase 2, which is predominantly found in muscles.

== Function ==
The enzyme can act as both a ribosylnicotinamide kinase (EC 2.7.1.22), catalyzing the reaction:

beta-nicotinamide D-ribonucleotide + diphosphate = 5-phospho-alpha-D-ribose 1-diphosphate + nicotinamide + H(+)

and a nicotinate riboside kinases (EC 2.7.1.173) and catalyze:

ATP + β-D-ribosylnicotinate = ADP + nicotinate β-D-ribonucleotide

In particular, it converts nicotinamide riboside into nicotinamide mononucleotide (NMN) and nicotinic acid riboside into nicotinic acid mononucleotide (NaMN). This reaction is part of one of the pathways of producing NAD^{+}, but NMN can also be directly produced from nicotinamide through the action of the enzyme nicotinamide phosphoribosyltransferase (see Nicotinamide adenine dinucleotide § Biosynthesis for more details).
