= NMN nucleosidase =

Class of enzymes

Identifiers
- EC no.: 3.2.2.14
- CAS no.: 37237-49-3

Databases
- BRENDA: enzyme data
- ExPASy: NiceZyme view
- KEGG: enzyme entry
- MetaCyc: metabolic pathway
- Rhea: reactions
- PDB structures: RCSB PDB PDBe PDBsum
- Gene Ontology: AmiGO / QuickGO
Search
- PMC: articles
- PubMed: articles
- NCBI: proteins

NMN nucleosidase (EC 3.2.2.14) is an enzyme characterised from Escherichia coli that catalyzes the hydrolysis of nicotinamide mononucleotide (NMN) to D-ribose 5-phosphate and nicotinamide:

nicotinamide mononucleotide
H_{2}O
D-ribose 5-phosphate
+
nicotinamide

This enzyme is a hydrolase, specifically a glycosylase that hydrolyses N-glycosyl compounds. The systematic name of this enzyme class is nicotinamide-nucleotide phosphoribohydrolase. Other names in common use include NMNase, nicotinamide mononucleotide nucleosidase, nicotinamide mononucleotidase, NMN glycohydrolase, and NMNGhase.
