= Robert N. Fried =

American filmmaker and media entrepreneur

Robert Nathan Fried
- Born: January 16, 1961 (age 65)
- Other name: Rob Fried
- Education: Cornell University; Columbia University Graduate School of Business
- Occupations: Film producer, screenwriter, studio executive, media entrepreneur
- Years active: 1985–present
- Title: CEO of Niagen Bioscience
- Spouse: Nancy Travis (m. 1994)
- Children: 2

Robert Nathan Fried (born January 16, 1961) is an American film producer and media, technology, and healthcare entrepreneur and is the CEO of Niagen Bioscience since 2018. He is the founder of Fried Films and Spiritclips, LLC, a division of Hallmark Cards which includes Hallmark eCards and Feeln. He previously was president and CEO of Savoy Pictures.

== Career ==
=== Entertainment ===
From 1983 to 1990, Fried held various executive positions in the entertainment industry. He was executive vice president of production for Columbia Pictures when Dawn Steel was president of Columbia Pictures in 1987, director of film finance and special projects for Columbia Pictures, and director of business development at 20th Century Fox. Orion Pictures hired Fried as vice president of production in 1986. He founded Fried Films, a production company, in 1990 and was founding CEO. As a film producer, Fried won an Academy Award in 1992 for his short film, Session Man. His film Rudy won the Christopher Award that year.

He was president and CEO of Savoy Pictures from December 1994 to June 1996. In 1996, Fried founded WhatsHotNow, an e-commerce company that sells entertainment memorabilia. He was chairman and CEO of the company until June 2001. In 2005, Collateral, a movie Fried produced, won an ASCAP award. Fried launched Spirit EMX, an internet video content company, in 2007. Hallmark Cards acquired Spirit EMX and rebranded it as SpiritClips, LLC, later [[Hallmark+]]. Fried was co-chairman of Tiger Media from October 2009 to August 2011.

=== Niagen Bioscience (formerly ChromaDex) ===
In 2015, Fried joined ChromaDex Corporation, now Niagen Bioscience (NASDAQ: NAGE), a science-based integrated reference standards and nutraceutical company, as a member of its Board of Directors. He became interested in the longevity field previously, investing in longevity biotech companies. In early 2016, Fried co-founded HealthSpan Research LLC with biochemist Dr. Charles Brenner. Through its subsidiary ProHealthSpan, the company introduced Tru Niagen, a consumer supplement featuring ChromaDex's patented ingredient Niagen (nicotinamide riboside (NR) chloride), an NAD+ precursor researched for its potential benefits in cellular health and age-related decline. In March 2017, ChromaDex acquired Healthspan Research.

Following the acquisition, Fried became President and Chief Operating Officer of ChromaDex in 2017. In April 2018, he was appointed Chief Executive Officer (CEO) of ChromaDex. Under his leadership, ChromaDex expanded its research and development of nicotinamide riboside and other NAD+ precursors for cellular health and longevity applications.

In March 2025, ChromaDex changed its corporate name to Niagen Bioscience.

== Personal life ==
Fried holds a Bachelor of Science degree from Cornell University and a Master of Business Administration degree from the Columbia University Graduate School of Business.

In 1994, he married actress Nancy Travis, who appeared in Fried's So I Married An Axe Murderer (1993). They have two sons.

== Filmography ==
Producer credits
Year	Title	Notes	Ref
1992	Session Man		
1993	Rudy		
1993	So I Married An Axe Murderer		
1994	Only You		
1998	Winchell	Executive producer	
1998	Godzilla	Executive producer	
1999	The Boondock Saints		
2001	Two Can Play That Game	Executive producer	
2004	Collateral		
2005	The Man		
2006	Man of the Year	Executive producer	
