= C8 (NAMPT activator) =

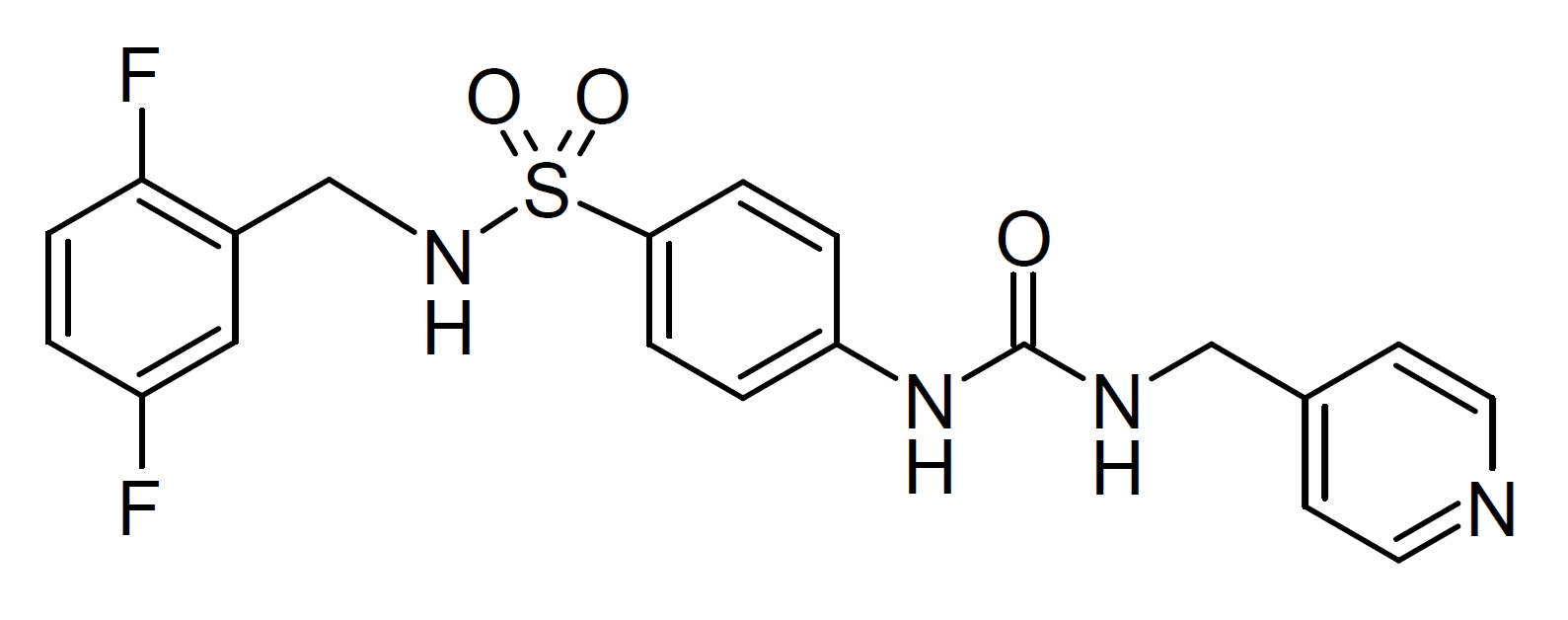

Clinical data
- Drug class: NAMPT activator

Identifiers
- IUPAC name: 1-[4-[(2,5-difluorophenyl)methylsulfamoyl]phenyl]-3-(pyridin-4-ylmethyl)urea
- PubChem CID: 170836210
- ChemSpider: 129954386

Chemical and physical data
- Formula: C_{20}H_{18}F_{2}N_{4}O_{3}S
- Molar mass: 432.45 g·mol^{−1}
- 3D model (JSmol): Interactive image
- SMILES: C1=CC(=CC=C1NC(=O)NCC2=CC=NC=C2)S(=O)(=O)NCC3=C(C=CC(=C3)F)F
- InChI: InChI=1S/C20H18F2N4O3S/c21-16-1-6-19(22)15(11-16)13-25-30(28,29)18-4-2-17(3-5-18)26-20(27)24-12-14-7-9-23-10-8-14/h1-11,25H,12-13H2,(H2,24,26,27); Key:QCDUEYXOVLJGAR-UHFFFAOYSA-N

C8 (NAMPT activator 5), is a drug which acts as a selective activator of the enzyme nicotinamide phosphoribosyltransferase (NAMPT). It increases the rate of nicotinamide mononucleotide production by NAMPT and shows anti-aging effects in model organisms such as Caenorhabditis elegans and mice.

== See also ==
- SBI-797812
