= ST7-OT3 =

Non-coding RNA found in humans

Identifiers
- Aliases: ST7-OT3, NCRNA00026, ST7, ST7 overlapping transcript 3
- External IDs: GeneCards: ST7-OT3
Orthologs
Databases	NCBI: entry
Species	Human	Mouse
Entrez	93655	n/a
Ensembl	n/a	n/a
UniProt	n a	n/a
RefSeq (mRNA)	n/a	n/a
RefSeq (protein)	n/a	n/a
Location (UCSC)	n/a	n/a
PubMed search		n/a
- Wikidata
View/Edit Human

In molecular biology, ST7 overlapping transcript 3 (non-protein coding), also known as ST7-OT3, is a long non-coding RNA. In humans, it is found on chromosome 7 in a locus spanning a translocation breakpoint associated with autism. It overlaps the ST7 gene, spanning intron 10 to exon 14 of ST7. Some isoforms of ST7 may use exons from ST7-OT3.

== See also ==
- Long noncoding RNA
