= C21H26O5 =

The molecular formula C_{21}H_{26}O_{5} (molar mass: 358.434 g/mol) may refer to:

- Prednisone
- Myricanol
