= Dihydronicotinamide mononucleotide =

Names
- IUPAC name [(2R,3S,4R,5R)-5-(3-Carbamoyl-4H-pyridin-1-yl)-3,4-dihydroxyoxolan-2-yl]methyl dihydrogen phosphate
- Other names Reduced nicotinamide mononucleotide

Identifiers
CAS Number	4229-56-5
3D model (JSmol)	Interactive image
Abbreviations	NMNH
ChEBI	CHEBI:74452
ChEMBL	ChEMBL2058993
ChemSpider	8149841
KEGG	C21113
PubChem CID	9974249
- InChI: InChI=1S/C11H17N2O8P/c12-10(16)6-2-1-3-13(4-6)11-9(15)8(14)7(21-11)5-20-22(17,18)19/h1,3-4,7-9,11,14-15H,2,5H2,(H2,12,16)(H2,17,18,19)/t7-,8-,9-,11-/m1/s1 Key: XQHMUSRSLNRVGA-TURQNECASA-N
- SMILES: C1C=CN(C=C1C(=O)N)[C@H]2[C@@H]([C@@H]([C@H](O2)COP(=O)(O)O)O)O

Properties
Chemical formula	C_{11}H_{17}N_{2}O_{8}P
Molar mass	336.237 g·mol^{−1}
- Except where otherwise noted, data are given for materials in their standard state (at 25 °C [77 °F], 100 kPa). Infobox references

NMNH (Dihydronicotinamide mononucleotide), also known as reduced nicotinamide mononucleotide. Both NMNH and NMN increase NAD+ levels in the body. NAD+ is a universal coenzyme that plays vital roles in nearly all living organisms functioning in various biological processes such as metabolism, cell signaling, gene regulation, and DNA repair.

== NAD+ precursors ==
The members of the NAD+ precursor family include tryptophan (Trp), nicotinic acid (NA), nicotinamide (NAM), nicotinamide ribose (NR), nicotinamide mononucleotide (NMN), reduced nicotinamide riboside (NRH) and reduced nicotinamide mononucleotide (NMNH) of these, the majority are logically vitamin B substances or their congeners Based on the bioavailability of its precursors, there are three pathways for the synthesis of NAD+ in cells.

- De Novo Biosynthesis Pathway: Convert NAD+ from tryptophan through the kynurenine pathway.
- Preiss-Handler Pathway: These include nicotinamide nucleotide transhydrogenase, which synthesizes NAD+ from nicotinic acid (NA).
- Salvage Pathway: biotransforms NAM, NR, and NMN into NAD+.

== Toxicity ==
A group of researchers from Tsinghua University considered the effect of NMNH on C57BL/6J male mice when they injected the animal with 50, 100, 500, or 1000 mg/kg NMNH intraperitoneally every other day for a week. This research indicates that serum levels of ALT and AST were not high thus leading to no evidence showing that NMNH is toxic to the liver when taken in higher dosages.

== Assessment ==
There is no public information on whether NMNH occurs naturally in plants and animals, although traces of NMNH may be present in the human body.

== Uses ==
NMNH can act as a potent NAD+ enhancer, potentially leading to a new generation of highly efficient NAD+-boosting molecules that could overcome the limitations of current NAD+ enhancers. [18] NMNH protects tubular epithelial cells against hypoxia/reoxygenation injury by enhancing repair.

== Absorption and metabolism ==
NMNH has proven to be a more effective NAD+ enhancer than NMN, achieving a 5-fold increase in NAD+ levels and sustaining elevated levels for six hours while maintaining high levels for up to 24 hours. NMNH treatment leads to a similar trend in NAD+ and NADH biosynthesis as NMN treatment, implying a shared pathway. However, NMNH was shown to inhibit the endogenous synthesis of NMN by blocking the action of nicotinamide phosphoribosyl transferase (NAMPT) This inhibition suggests that NMNH may be more effective than NMN in directly stimulating NAD+ production.
