= Ribosylnicotinamide kinase =

Class of enzymes

Identifiers
- EC no.: 2.7.1.22
- CAS no.: 9030-61-9

Databases
- BRENDA: enzyme data
- ExPASy: NiceZyme view
- KEGG: enzyme entry
- MetaCyc: metabolic pathway
- Rhea: reactions
- PDB structures: RCSB PDB PDBe PDBsum
- Gene Ontology: AmiGO / QuickGO
Search
- PMC: articles
- PubMed: articles
- NCBI: proteins

Ribosylnicotinamide kinase (EC 2.7.1.22) is an enzyme that in humans is encoded by the genes NMRK1 and NMRK2. This type of enzyme catalyzes the chemical reaction

ATP +
nicotinamide riboside
ADP +
nicotinamide mononucleotide

The enzyme characterised from liver converts the riboside, nicotinamide riboside, to the ribonucleotide, nicotinamide mononucleotide, by transferring a phosphate group from the cofactor, adenosine triphosphate (ATP), which is converted to adenosine diphosphate (ADP). This reaction is part of one of the biosynthesis pathways for the coenzyme, nicotinamide adenine dinucleotide. The other major one instead involves the enzyme nicotinamide phosphoribosyltransferase.

This enzyme is a transferase, specifically one transferring phosphorus-containing groups (phosphotransferases) with an alcohol group as acceptor. The systematic name of this enzyme class is ATP:N-ribosylnicotinamide 5'-phosphotransferase. This enzyme is also called ribosylnicotinamide kinase (phosphorylating).

== Food ==
The enzyme can be found in milk and beer. Since the molecules are difficult to detect, it is expected that there are a lot more food products containing ribosylnicotinamide kinase.
