= SBI-797812 =

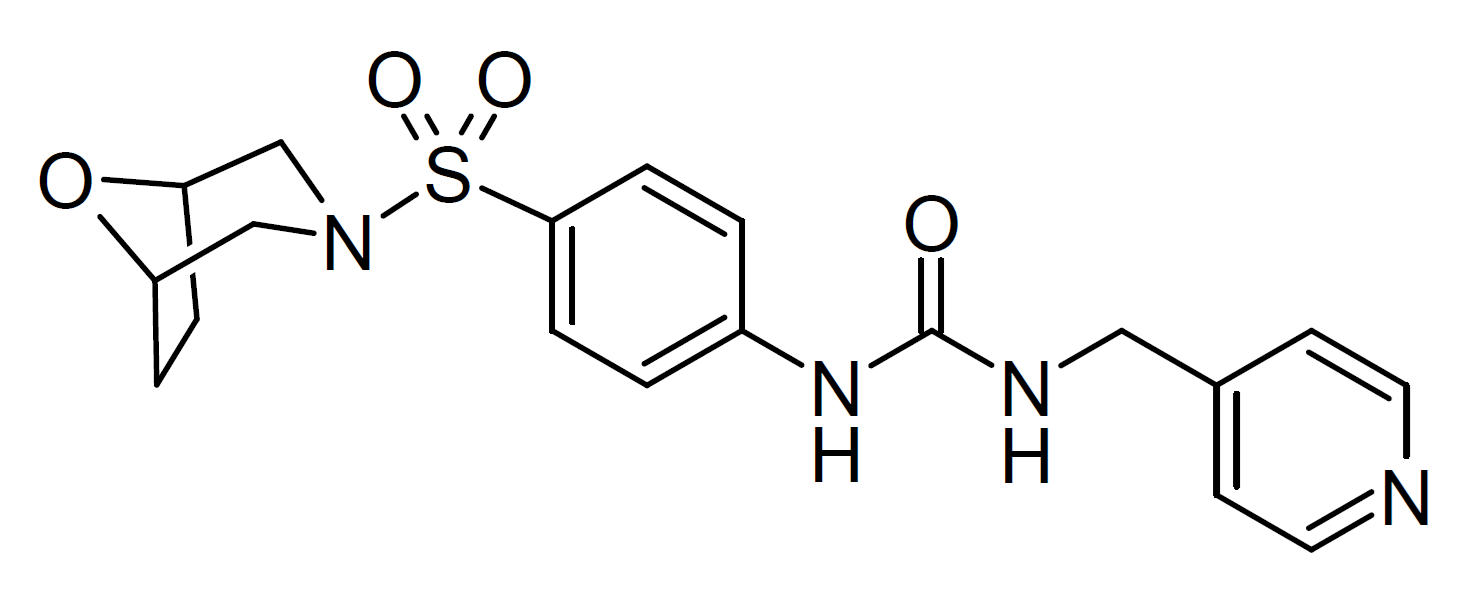

Clinical data
- Drug class: NAMPT activator

Identifiers
- IUPAC name: 1-[4-(8-oxa-3-azabicyclo[3.2.1]octan-3-ylsulfonyl)phenyl]-3-(pyridin-4-ylmethyl)urea
- CAS Number: 2237268-08-3
- PubChem CID: 135222620
- ChemSpider: 78316901
- ChEMBL: ChEMBL4846686

Chemical and physical data
- Formula: C_{19}H_{22}N_{4}O_{4}S
- Molar mass: 402.47 g·mol^{−1}
- 3D model (JSmol): Interactive image
- SMILES: C1CC2CN(CC1O2)S(=O)(=O)C3=CC=C(C=C3)NC(=O)NCC4=CC=NC=C4
- InChI: InChI=1S/C19H22N4O4S/c24-19(21-11-14-7-9-20-10-8-14)22-15-1-5-18(6-2-15)28(25,26)23-12-16-3-4-17(13-23)27-16/h1-2,5-10,16-17H,3-4,11-13H2,(H2,21,22,24); Key:KTSOHNHLOLGQCY-UHFFFAOYSA-N

SBI-797812, is a drug which acts as a selective activator of the enzyme nicotinamide phosphoribosyltransferase (NAMPT). It increases the rate of nicotinamide mononucleotide production by NAMPT and decreases feedback inhibition by NAD+. It has been researched for application as a potential anti-aging drug.

== See also ==
- C8 (NAMPT activator)
