= Niagen Bioscience =

Food ingredient company in California

Niagen Bioscience, Inc
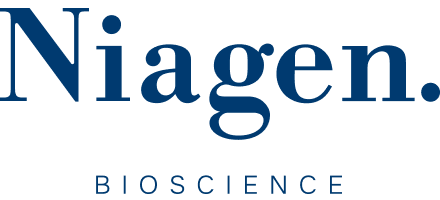
- Type: Public
- Traded as: Nasdaq: NAGE; Russell 2000 Index component
- Industry: Dietary supplements, food ingredients, chemical sample analysis
- Founded: 1999
- Headquarters: Los Angeles, California, United States
- Key people: Rob Fried (CEO); Frank Jaksch (Cofounder, Executive Chairman)
- Products: Tru Niagen; Niagen Plus
- Revenue: ▲US$129 million (2025)
- Net income: ▲US$17.4 million (2025)
- Website: https://www.niagenbioscience.com/

Niagen Bioscience (NASDAQ: NAGE), formerly ChromaDex, is a bioscience сompany based in Los Angeles, California founded in 1999. The company operates in multiple sectors including reference standards, dietary supplements, and ingredient technology. Niagen Bioscience is publicly traded on the NASDAQ.

== History ==
Founded in 1999 by Frank Jaksch, ChromaDex began as a standards company serving the natural products industry. The company expanded its operations by acquiring licensed patents from Dartmouth College, Cornell University, and Washington University in St. Louis regarding nicotinamide riboside, which it markets and sells as an ingredient under the brand name Niagen.

In 2015, Robert "Rob" Fried joined ChromaDex's board of directors.

Niagen Bioscience is traded on the NASDAQ (as NAGE), as of March 2025, and was added to the U.S. Small Cap Russell 2000 Index in June 2018.

In March 2017, the company acquired HealthSpan Research LLC and its product Tru Niagen, a standalone nicotinamide riboside supplement, sold directly to U.S. consumers. Following this acquisition, Rob Fried was appointed president and Chief Operating Officer of ChromaDex.

Also in 2017, ChromaDex raised $48 million to support research and development.

In April 2018, Rob Fried was appointed chief executive officer of ChromaDex, succeeding Frank Jaksch, who transitioned to the position of Executive Chairman.

On March 19, 2025, ChromaDex, Corp. was officially renamed Niagen Bioscience.

== Research and development ==
Niagen Bioscience has invested in research on nicotinamide riboside and its role in increasing NAD+ levels in the body. The company has partnered with multiple research institutions, such as the National Institutes of Health, the Biotechnology and Biological Sciences Research Council, and Northwestern University Feinberg School of Medicine, to study the potential benefits of nicotinamide riboside on various aspects of health and aging.

In April 2018, Rob Fried was appointed chief executive officer of Niagen Bioscience, succeeding Frank Jaksch, who transitioned to the position of Executive Chairman. As of 2025, ChromaDex has supported over 35 human clinical studies investigating the safety, efficacy, and benefits of Niagen (nicotinamide riboside chloride).
