= P7C3 =

Chemical compound

Identifiers
- IUPAC name: 1-anilino-3-(3,6-dibromocarbazol-9-yl)propan-2-ol
- CAS Number: 301353-96-8
- PubChem CID: 2836187
- ChemSpider: 2113543
- UNII: 77ZWJ3QXR9
- ChEMBL: ChEMBL2442630
- CompTox Dashboard (EPA): DTXSID70385472

Chemical and physical data
- Formula: C_{21}H_{18}Br_{2}N_{2}O
- Molar mass: 474.196 g·mol^{−1}
- 3D model (JSmol): Interactive image
- SMILES: c4ccccc4NCC(O)Cn2c1ccc(Br)cc1c(c3)c2ccc3Br
- InChI: InChI=1S/C21H18Br2N2O/c22-14-6-8-20-18(10-14)19-11-15(23)7-9-21(19)25(20)13-17(26)12-24-16-4-2-1-3-5-16/h1-11,17,24,26H,12-13H2; Key:FZHHRERIIVOATI-UHFFFAOYSA-N

P7C3 (pool 7, compound 3) is a drug related to latrepirdine (dimebon) which has neuroprotective and proneurogenic effects and may be potentially useful for the treatment of Alzheimer's disease and similar neurodegenerative disorders. The pharmacological effects of P7C3 in vitro resemble those of endogenous proneurogenic peptides such as fibroblast growth factor 1 (FGF-1), and the proneurogenic activity of P7C3 was around thirty times that of latrepirdine when they were compared in mice. P7C3 was chosen for further animal studies on the basis of favorable pharmacokinetic factors, such as its high oral bioavailability and long duration of action, but several other related compounds showed similar activity such as the more potent fluorinated analogue P7C3-A20 which is up to ten times stronger again, and the methoxy analogue P7C3-OMe, for which it was determined that the (R) enantiomer is the active form.

P7C3-A20

(R)-P7C3-OMe

The mechanism of action of the P7C3 series of compounds involves activation of nicotinamide phosphoribosyltransferase (NAMPT), the rate-limiting enzyme responsible for the transformation of nicotinamide into nicotinamide adenine dinucleotide (NAD). By activating NAMPT, the P7C3 compounds result in an increase in intracellular levels of NAD.
