= JGB-1-155 =

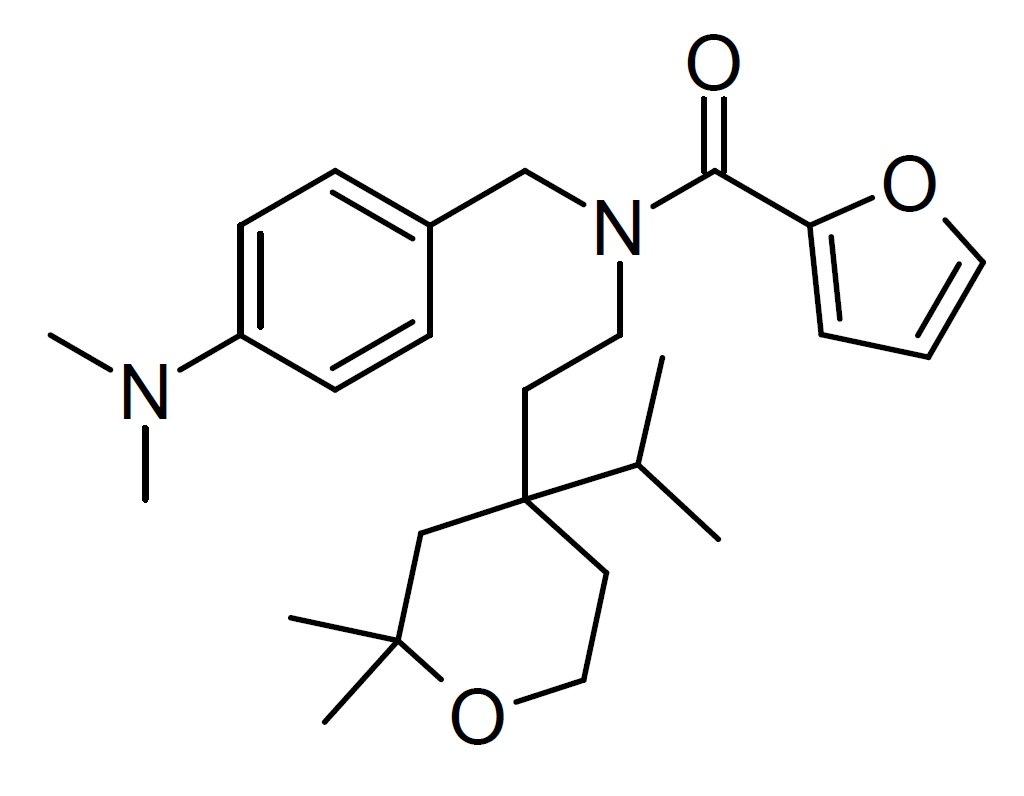

Clinical data
- Drug class: NAMPT positive allosteric modulator

Identifiers
- IUPAC name: N-[[4-(dimethylamino)phenyl]methyl]-N-[2-(2,2-dimethyl-4-propan-2-yloxan-4-yl)ethyl]furan-2-carboxamide
- CAS Number: 3011930-28-9
- PubChem CID: 170327283
- ChemSpider: 129885828
- ChEMBL: ChEMBL5430209

Chemical and physical data
- Formula: C_{26}H_{38}N_{2}O_{3}
- Molar mass: 426.601 g·mol^{−1}
- 3D model (JSmol): Interactive image
- SMILES: CC(C)C1(CCOC(C1)(C)C)CCN(CC2=CC=C(C=C2)N(C)C)C(=O)C3=CC=CO3
- InChI: InChI=1S/C26H38N2O3/c1-20(2)26(14-17-31-25(3,4)19-26)13-15-28(24(29)23-8-7-16-30-23)18-21-9-11-22(12-10-21)27(5)6/h7-12,16,20H,13-15,17-19H2,1-6H3; Key:XUAJYFDMEHVNTH-UHFFFAOYSA-N

JGB-1-155, is a drug which acts as a selective positive allosteric modulator of the enzyme nicotinamide phosphoribosyltransferase (NAMPT). It has neuroprotective effects, and was developed as a potential treatment for neurodegenerative diseases such as Alzheimer's disease.
