= Padnarsertib =

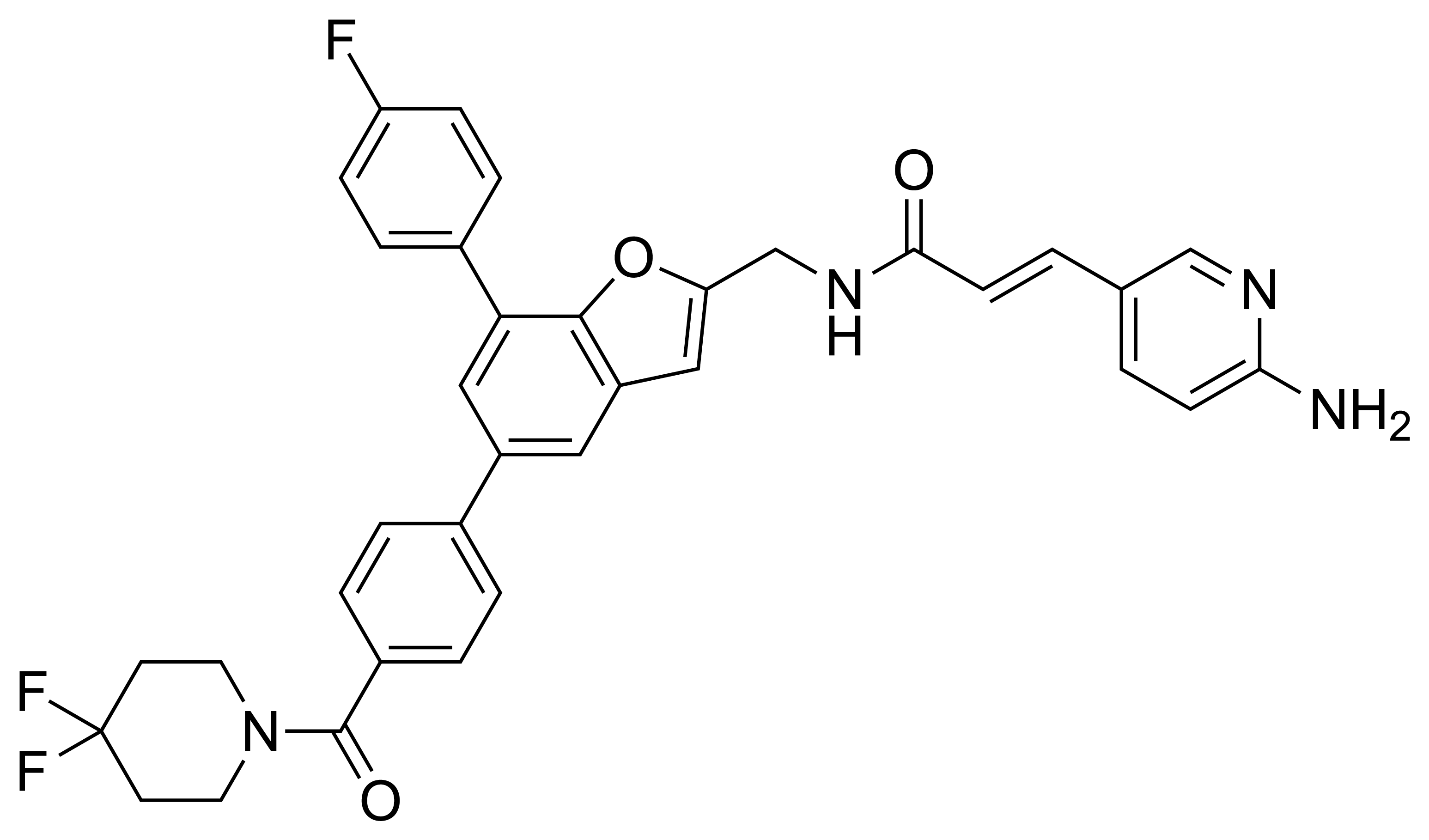

Clinical data
- Drug class: NAMPT / PAK4 dual inhibitor

Identifiers
- IUPAC name: (E)-3-(6-amino-3-pyridinyl)-N-[[5-[4-(4,4-difluoropiperidine-1-carbonyl)phenyl]-7-(4-fluorophenyl)-1-benzofuran-2-yl]methyl]prop-2-enamide
- CAS Number: 1643913-93-2
- PubChem CID: 117779453
- IUPHAR/BPS: 10593
- DrugBank: DB19243
- ChemSpider: 38772371
- UNII: 9T56TV18X7
- ChEMBL: ChEMBL4297467

Chemical and physical data
- Formula: C_{35}H_{29}F_{3}N_{4}O_{3}
- Molar mass: 610.637 g·mol^{−1}
- 3D model (JSmol): Interactive image
- SMILES: C1CN(CCC1(F)F)C(=O)C2=CC=C(C=C2)C3=CC(=C4C(=C3)C=C(O4)CNC(=O)/C=C/C5=CN=C(C=C5)N)C6=CC=C(C=C6)F
- InChI: InChI=1S/C35H29F3N4O3/c36-28-9-7-24(8-10-28)30-19-26(23-3-5-25(6-4-23)34(44)42-15-13-35(37,38)14-16-42)17-27-18-29(45-33(27)30)21-41-32(43)12-2-22-1-11-31(39)40-20-22/h1-12,17-20H,13-16,21H2,(H2,39,40)(H,41,43)/b12-2+; Key:MRFOPLWJZULAQD-SWGQDTFXSA-N

Padnarsertib (KPT-9274), is a drug which acts as a dual inhibitor of the enzymes p21-activated kinase 4 (PAK4) and nicotinamide phosphoribosyltransferase (NAMPT). It has potential applications in the treatment of some forms of cancer.
