= Nicotinamide riboside kinase 2 =

Enzyme found in humans

NMRK2

Identifiers
- Aliases: NMRK2, ITGB1BP3, MIBP, NRK2, nicotinamide riboside kinase 2
- External IDs: OMIM: 608705; MGI: 1916814; GeneCards: NMRK2
Enzyme activity
EC #	BRENDA	ExPASy	KEGG	MetaCyc
2.7.1.22	↗	↗	↗	↗
2.7.1.173	↗	↗	↗	↗

Gene location (Human)
Chr.	Chromosome 19 (human)
Band	19p13.3	Start	3,933,069 bp
Band	19p13.3	End	3,942,416 bp

Gene location (Mouse)
Chr.	Chromosome 10 (mouse)
Band	10|10 C1	Start	81,034,004 bp
Band	10|10 C1	End	81,037,885 bp
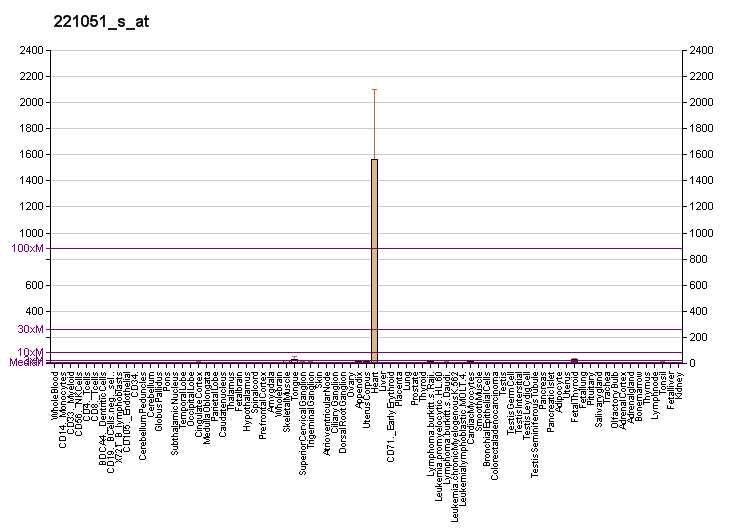
RNA expression pattern
Bgee	Human / Mouse (ortholog); Top expressed in: apex of heart; right auricle of heart; left ventricle; cardiac muscle tissue of right atrium; gastrocnemius muscle; triceps brachii muscle; myocardium of left ventricle; right ventricle; glutes; vastus lateralis muscle / Top expressed in: knee joint; vastus lateralis muscle; triceps brachii muscle; sternocleidomastoid muscle; digastric muscle; skeletal muscle tissue; tibialis anterior muscle; temporal muscle; soleus muscle; intercostal muscle; More reference expression data
BioGPS	More reference expression data
Gene ontology
Molecular function	transferase activity; nucleotide binding; protein binding; ATP binding; metal ion binding; kinase activity; ribosylnicotinamide kinase activity; ribosylnicotinate kinase activity
Cellular component	intracellular anatomical structure; nucleoplasm; cytosol; plasma membrane; intracellular membrane-bounded organelle
Biological process	pyridine nucleotide biosynthetic process; negative regulation of myoblast differentiation; NAD biosynthetic process; phosphorylation; NAD metabolic process
Sources:Amigo / QuickGO
Orthologs
Databases	NCBI: entry; OMA: entry
Species	Human	Mouse
Entrez	27231	69564
Ensembl	ENSG00000077009	ENSMUSG00000004939
UniProt	Q9NPI5	Q9D7C9
RefSeq (mRNA)	NM_001289117; NM_014446; NM_170678; NM_001375467; NM_001375468 NM_001375469	NM_027120
RefSeq (protein)	NP_001276046; NP_733778; NP_001362396; NP_001362397; NP_001362398	NP_081396
Location (UCSC)	Chr 19: 3.93 – 3.94 Mb	Chr 10: 81.03 – 81.04 Mb
PubMed search
- Wikidata
View/Edit Human	View/Edit Mouse

Nicotinamide riboside kinase 2 is an enzyme that in humans is encoded by the NMRK2 gene (previously ITGB1BP3). As a nicotinamide riboside kinase (EC 2.7.1.22), this enzyme functions to phosphorylate nicotinamide riboside which produces nicotinamide mononucleotide, an important enzyme cofactor. Nicotinamide riboside kinase 2 is primarily found in the muscle and heart, unlike the other known human isoform, nicotinamide riboside kinase 1, which is more widely expressed.

== Interactions ==
NMRK2 has been shown to interact with ST7.
