= Daporinad =

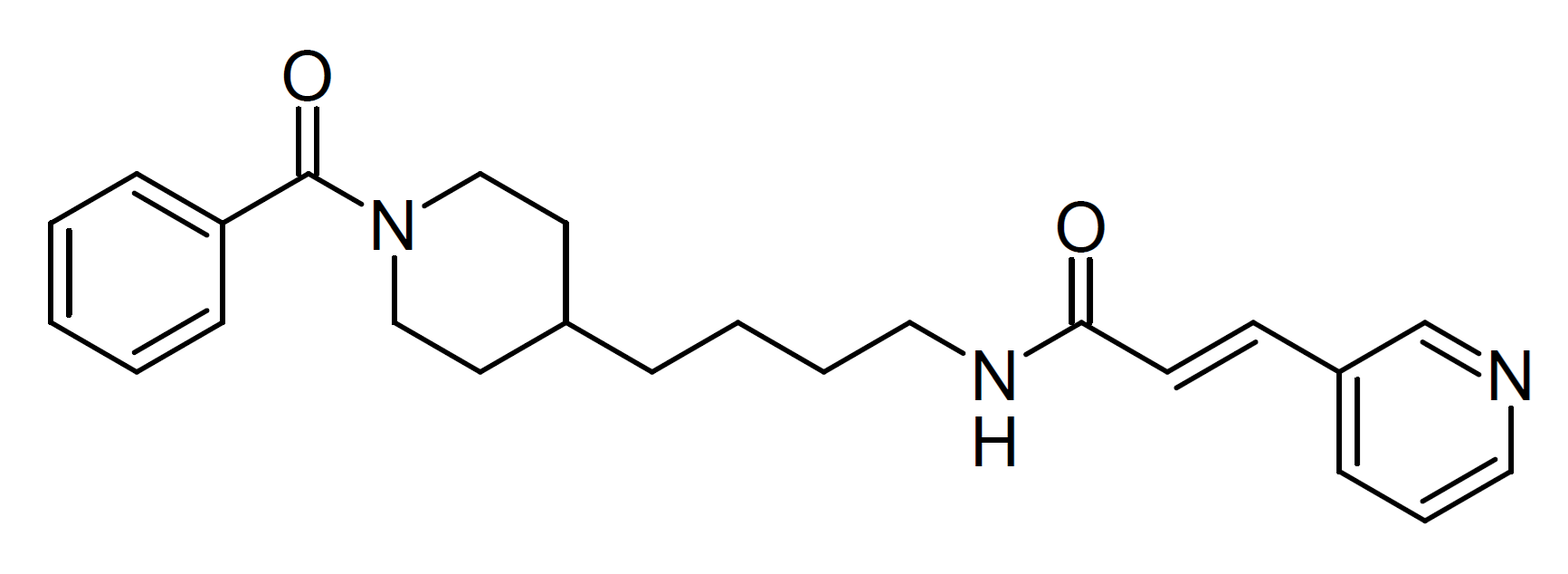

Clinical data
- Drug class: NAMPT inhibitor

Identifiers
- IUPAC name: (E)-N-[4-(1-benzoylpiperidin-4-yl)butyl]-3-pyridin-3-ylprop-2-enamide
- CAS Number: 658084-64-1
- PubChem CID: 6914657
- IUPHAR/BPS: 7745
- DrugBank: DB12731
- ChemSpider: 5290535
- UNII: V71TF6V9M7
- ChEBI: CHEBI:187413
- ChEMBL: ChEMBL566757
- CompTox Dashboard (EPA): DTXSID101026050
- ECHA InfoCard: 100.316.982

Chemical and physical data
- Formula: C_{24}H_{29}N_{3}O_{2}
- Molar mass: 391.515 g·mol^{−1}
- 3D model (JSmol): Interactive image
- SMILES: C1CN(CCC1CCCCNC(=O)/C=C/C2=CN=CC=C2)C(=O)C3=CC=CC=C3
- InChI: InChI=1S/C24H29N3O2/c28-23(12-11-21-8-6-15-25-19-21)26-16-5-4-7-20-13-17-27(18-14-20)24(29)22-9-2-1-3-10-22/h1-3,6,8-12,15,19-20H,4-5,7,13-14,16-18H2,(H,26,28)/b12-11+; Key:KPBNHDGDUADAGP-VAWYXSNFSA-N

Daporinad (FK866, APO866), is a drug which acts as a selective inhibitor of the enzyme nicotinamide phosphoribosyltransferase (NAMPT). Levels of this enzyme are elevated in certain forms of cancer such as leukemia, and it was hoped that NAMPT inhibitors would be useful in the treatment of cancer. Unfortunately, dapinorad was unsuccessful in clinical trials due to lack of efficacy, but it still has antiinflammatory effects and may be useful for other medical applications such as arthritis, as well as being widely used as a tool compound for the study of NAMPT and its function.

Daporinad was originally identified and developed by Klinge Pharma G.m.b.H., Development rights then moved through a corporate chain in which Fujisawa Deutschland GmbH which later merged into Astellas held APO866/FK866 and subsequently out-licensed the worldwide development and marketing rights to the Danish oncology company TopoTarget in 2005, after which TopoTarget merged with BioAlliance Pharma to form Onxeo, which later rebranded as Valerio Therapeutics.
