= Myricanol =

Identifiers
- IUPAC name: (9R)-16,17-dimethoxytricyclo[12.3.1.1^{2,6}]nonadeca-1(17),2,4,6(19),14(18),15-hexaene-3,9,15-triol
- CAS Number: 33606-81-4
- PubChem CID: 161779
- ChemSpider: 142086
- ChEMBL: ChEMBL2152654
- CompTox Dashboard (EPA): DTXSID10955239

Chemical and physical data
- Formula: C_{21}H_{26}O_{5}
- Molar mass: 358.434 g·mol^{−1}
- 3D model (JSmol): Interactive image
- SMILES: COC1=C2C=C(CCCC[C@H](CCC3=CC2=C(C=C3)O)O)C(=C1OC)O
- InChI: InChI=1S/C21H26O5/c1-25-20-17-12-14(19(24)21(20)26-2)5-3-4-6-15(22)9-7-13-8-10-18(23)16(17)11-13/h8,10-12,15,22-24H,3-7,9H2,1-2H3/t15-/m1/s1; Key:SBGBAZQAEOWGFT-OAHLLOKOSA-N

Myricanol, is a natural product which acts as an activator of the enzymes nicotinamide phosphoribosyltransferase (NAMPT) and SIRT1, along with various other activities. It is derived from the ayurvedic medicinal plant Myrica nagi and other related species along with other similar compounds such as myricetin.

It has hepatoprotective, reno-protective neuroprotective and anti-cancer properties in experimental models, and lowers levels of microtubule-associated protein tau.
