= NAD-I riboswitch =

Conserved RNA structure

nadA
- Consensus secondary structure and sequence conservation of nadA RNA

Identifiers
- Symbol: nadA
- Rfam: RF03013

Other data
- RNA type: Gene; sRNA
- SO: SO:0001263
- PDB structures: PDBe

The NAD-I riboswitch (also known as the nadA RNA motif) is a conserved RNA structure found in bacteria, primarily within the phylum Acidobacteriota. All known NAD-I riboswitch representatives are located upstream of nadA genes, which encode quinolinate synthase, an enzyme that catalyzes an early step in the de novo biosynthetic pathway for NAD⁺. The nadA RNA motif was first identified through a comparative genomic search for structured noncoding RNAs (ncRNA) in bacterial intergenic regions.

Approximately two-thirds of all known bacterial riboswitch classes respond to compounds derived from RNA nucleotides, including cofactors such as thiamin pyrophosphate (TPP), flavin mononucleotide (FMN), adenosylcobalamin (AdoCbl), and S-adenosylmethionine (SAM). NAD⁺ is recognised as another ancient and ubiquitous nucleotide-derived coenzyme, were nadA RNA motif proved to acts as a riboswitch for the enzyme cofactor NAD+.

== Structure ==
=== Tandem Aptamer Architecture ===
nadA motif RNAs invariably occur as a tandem pair of two highly similar aptamer domains, referred to as Domain 1 and Domain 2.

Each domain forms two base-paired stems P1 and P1a flanking a conserved internal bulge carrying the near-identical sequence "ACANCCCC". Domain 1 is further distinguished by an additional internal loop (sequence "AGYG") between P1a and a third stem, P1b. Domain 2 carries a purine-rich region in the right shoulder of stem P1′ predicted to serve as the ribosome binding site (RBS) for the downstream nadA open reading frame (ORF).

=== Expression Platform ===
The expression platform of NAD⁺-I riboswitches is predicted to operate as a translational "OFF" switch. When ligand is present, formation of the P1a′ stem which incorporates RBS nucleotides sequesters the ribosome binding site, blocking translation initiation of the nadA ORF and thereby suppressing NAD⁺ biosynthesis. This regulatory logic is the same as that employed by many riboswitch classes that repress genes in response to elevated cofactor levels.
