= Nicotinamide riboside =

Vitamer of Vitamin B3

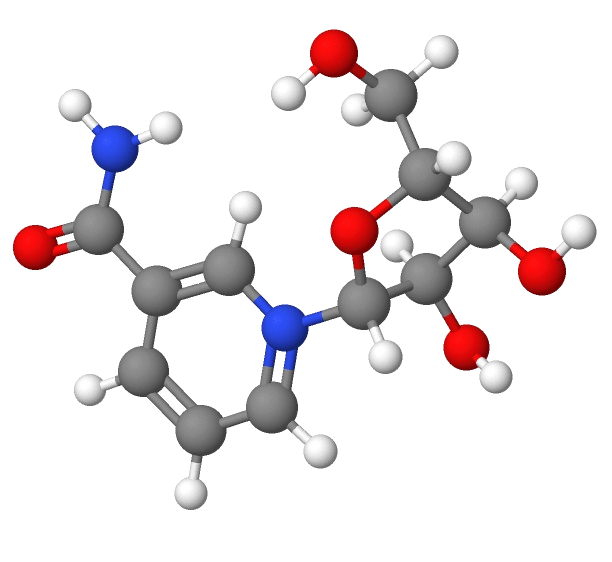

Names
- IUPAC name 3-Carbamoyl-1-(β-D-ribofuranosyl)pyridin-1-ium
- Systematic IUPAC name 3-Carbamoyl-1-[(2R,3R,4S,5R)-3,4-dihydroxy-5-(hydroxymethyl)oxolan-2-yl]pyridin-1-ium
- Other names 1-(β-D-Ribofuranosyl)nicotinamide; N-Ribosylnicotinamide

Identifiers
CAS Number	1341-23-7
3D model (JSmol)	Interactive image
ChEBI	CHEBI:15927
ChemSpider	388956
PubChem CID	439924
UNII	0I8H2M0L7N
CompTox Dashboard (EPA)	DTXSID501010039
- InChI: InChI=1S/C11H14N2O5/c12-10(17)6-2-1-3-13(4-6)11-9(16)8(15)7(5-14)18
- SMILES: c1cc(c[n+](c1)[C@H]2[C@@H]([C@@H]([C@H](O2)CO)O)O)C(=O)N

Properties
Chemical formula	C_{11}H_{15}N_{2}O_{5}^{+}
Molar mass	255.25 g/mol
Melting point	Complete thermal degradation occurs above 130°C (chloride salt)
- Except where otherwise noted, data are given for materials in their standard state (at 25 °C [77 °F], 100 kPa). Infobox references

Nicotinamide riboside (NR, SR647) is a pyridine-nucleoside and a form of vitamin B_{3}. It functions as a precursor to nicotinamide adenine dinucleotide, or NAD, through a two-step and a three-step pathway.

== Chemistry ==
While the molecular weight of nicotinamide riboside is 255.25 g/mol, that of its chloride salt is 290.70 g/mol. As such, 100 mg of nicotinamide riboside chloride provides 88 mg of nicotinamide riboside.

=== Stability and degradation ===
NRCl is susceptible to degradation through both thermal decomposition and base-catalyzed hydrolysis:

- Thermal degradation: Decomposition occurs rapidly at temperatures above 130°C, producing nicotinamide (NAM) and ribose.
- Degradation kinetics: NRCl degradation follows pseudo-first-order kinetics, with the degradation rate doubling for every 10°C increase in temperature. At pH 7.4, degradation is significantly faster than in acidic conditions, highlighting the importance of pH control for formulation stability.

These properties emphasize the need for careful formulation strategies to ensure NRCl's stability during storage, processing, and delivery.

== History ==
Nicotinamide riboside (NR) has been identified as an NAD precursor, involved in salvage NAD synthesis in both bacteria and eukaryotes. In bacteria, it was first described in 1944 as a necessary growth factor for the culture of Haemophilus influenzae, H. influenzae was identified as requiring both X factor (hemin) and V factor (NAD) to grow. V factor, purified from blood, was shown to exist in three forms: nicotinamide adenine dinucleotide (NAD), NMN and NR. NR was the compound that led to the most rapid growth of the H. influenzae bacterium.

H. influenzae cannot grow on nicotinic acid (NA), nicotinamide (NAM), or amino acids such as tryptophan (Trp) or aspartic acid (Asp), which were the previously known precursors of NAD. H. influenzae depends entirely on salvage of NAD precursors from other cells in its environment.

The identification of nicotinamide riboside (NR) as an NAD precursor in eukaryotes developed out of the study of pellagra. Pellagra was the first disease to be associated with NAD deficiency. It was linked to nutritional deficiency by Joseph Goldberger in 1914, and to deficiency of niacin (vitamin B_{3}) by Conrad Elvehjem in 1937. NAD (then called coenzyme I) was shown to be extremely low in cases of pellagra, and NA and NAM were identified as molecular precursors in rebuilding NAD levels. Pellagra is now understood as a severe, chronic depletion of NAD, which can be treated through diet.

Subsequent studies of NAD metabolism have identified regulatory pathways used by cells and tissues to maintain NAD availability. NAD and its precursors nicotinic acid (NA) and nicotinamide (NAM) have been shown to be vital cofactors in cellular oxidation/reduction reactions and ATP synthesis. Classic NAD synthesis pathways characterized in eukaryotes include an eight-step de novo pathway from Trp and two pathways using the NAD precursors NA and NAM: a three-step NA-based pathway known as the Preiss-Handler pathway; and an NAM-based pathway involving the enzyme Nicotinamide phosphoribosyltransferase (NAMPT) and the formation of nicotinamide mononucleotide (NMN).

In 2004, a previously unknown pathway was reported when nicotinamide riboside (NR) was identified as an additional NAD precursor in eukaryotes. NR is now recognized as a form of vitamin B_{3} which can be found in both cow and human milk. Once internalized into a cell, NR is rapidly phosphorylated by the activity of nicotinamide riboside kinase enzymes (NRK1 and NRK2) to form nicotinamide mononucleotide (NMN), bypassing the previously known biosynthetic routes to NAD production. NMN is then converted to NAD by NMN-adenylyltransferase (NMNAT).

Research in mammals indicates that NRK1 is a cytosolic protein, encoded by the Nmrk1 gene. It is found in most tissues but predominantly in the liver and kidney. The NRK2 protein may be related to muscle tissue including cardiac muscle. It is encoded by the Nmrk2 gene and appears to be more highly expressed in cases of metabolic stress or cellular damage. Since different types of tissues display differing concentrations of NR and NRKs, it is likely that NR utilization will vary in different tissues.

Metabolic studies indicate that NAD, once considered a stable molecule, is continuously turned over and used, requiring tight regulation to maintain metabolic homeostasis. NR utilization in mammals may involve both exogenous dietary sources and endogenous salvage processes that recycle intermediates. NR metabolism and the interactions of different NAD pathways continue to be studied. The NAM and NR pathways involve an amide group and are referred to as 'amidated' pathways. The pathways for de novo synthesis from tryptophan and from NA salvage are 'deamidated' pathways, which share a rate-limiting amidation enzyme NADsynthase1 (NADSYN). Disruptions or imbalances in NAD metabolism have been observed in many disease conditions, and the possibility of restoring NAD levels by administering NAD precursors is an area of interest for researchers.

== Biosynthesis ==
Nicotinamide riboside (NR) is now known to be an NAD precursor, involved in the biosynthetic pathways that convert B_{3} vitamins into NAD. NAD is primarily synthesized in mammals de novo from tryptophan, through the Priess-Handler pathway from nicotinic acid (NA) or via a salvage pathway from nicotinamide (NAM).

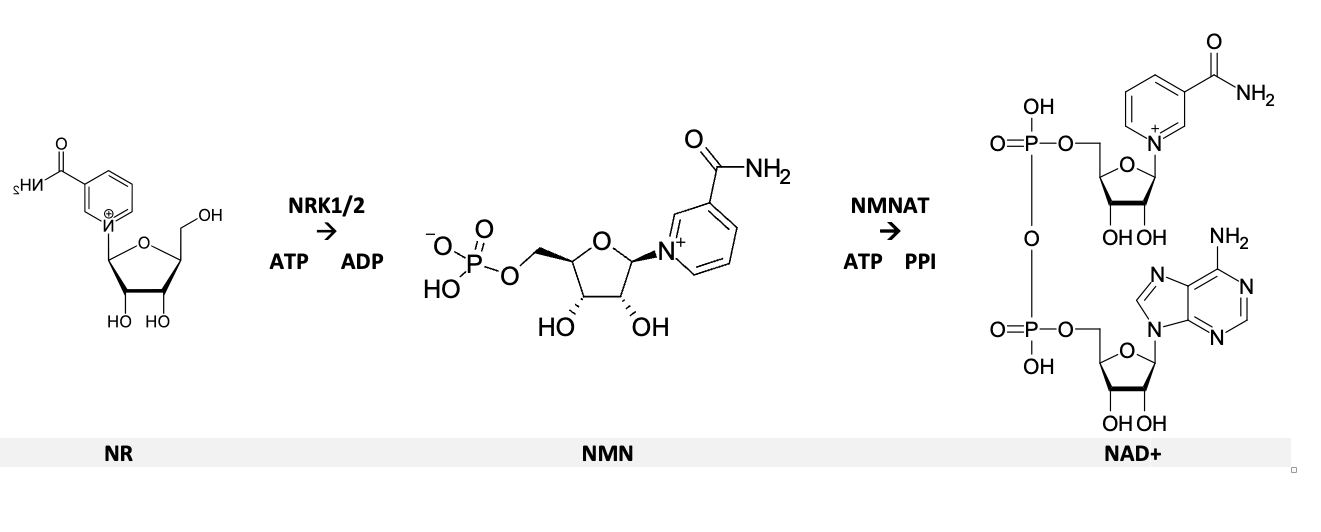
NRK1/2 mediated pathway from NR to NAD^{+}

Nicotinamide riboside (NR) is utilized through an additional pathway involving phosphorylation by the nicotinamide riboside kinase enzymes (NRK1 and NRK2). In yeasts, NR has also been shown to be degraded by the nucleosidases Pnp1, Urh1 and Meu1, before being converted to NAD via the Preiss-Handler pathway and the action of the nicotinamidase Pnc1.

== Commercialization ==
ChromaDex (now Niagen Bioscience) licensed patents for nicotinamide riboside from Dartmouth College, Cornell University, and Washington University in St. Louis in July 2012. The company developed a commercial production process for nicotinamide riboside chloride, trademarking the active ingredient as Niagen. ChromaDex has continued to expand using the brand name Tru Niagen globally while also supplying Niagen as an ingredient to other manufacturers.

ChromaDex was in a patent dispute with Elysium Health over the rights to nicotinamide riboside supplements between 2016 and 2023. ChromaDex holds multiple patents related to nicotinamide riboside, including manufacturing methods, compositions, and uses. As of 2023, ChromaDex's patent portfolio for nicotinamide riboside includes 50+ granted patents and numerous pending patent applications worldwide.

As of March 19, 2025, ChromaDex was renamed Niagen Bioscience, and now trades under the Ticker Symbol 'NAGE'.

== Safety designations ==
In 2016, the U.S. Food and Drug Administration (FDA) accepted nicotinamide riboside chloride (NRC, Niagen) as Generally recognized as safe (GRAS) as described in the dossier prepared by ChromaDex, Inc.

The above regulatory acceptances were all in relation to the safety and manufacturing information provided by ChromaDex, Inc. for Niagen. It was designated a new dietary ingredient (NDI) for use in dietary supplements by the U.S. Food and Drug Administration in 2015 and 2017. It was listed in Health Canada's Licensed Natural Health Products Database (LNHPD) in 2018. The European Union has granted NRC a "New dietary ingredient" designation as a novel food pursuant to Regulation (EU) 2015/2283, as of 2019. It was authorized for use in food supplements by the EU in 2020. The EFSA Panel on Nutrition, Novel Foods and Food Allergens (NDA) considered it as safe as pure nicotinamide for use in food for special medical purposes (FSMP) and total diet replacement for weight control (TDRWC) in adults as of 2021 but noted that further investigation would be required to establish safety for some other types of use. The Australian government has given nicotinamide riboside chloride a positive listing under the compositional guidelines of its Therapeutic Goods Administration (TGA).

== See also ==
- Nicotinamide mononucleotide
- Niacin
- Nicotinamide
- Vitamin B3
- Nicotinamide adenine dinucleotide
- Sirtuin
- Poly (ADP-ribose) polymerase
