= ST7 =

Human protein and coding gene

Identifiers
- Aliases: ST7, ETS7q, FAM4A, FAM4A1, HELG, RAY1, SEN4, TSG7, suppression of tumorigenicity 7
- External IDs: OMIM: 600833; MGI: 1927450; HomoloGene: 10185; GeneCards: ST7; OMA:ST7 - orthologs

Gene location (Human)
| Chr. | Chromosome 7 (human) |
| Band | 7q31.2 | Start | 116,953,238 bp |
| Band | 7q31.2 | End | 117,230,103 bp |

Gene location (Mouse)
| Chr. | Chromosome 6 (mouse) |
| Band | 6|6 A2 | Start | 17,692,932 bp |
| Band | 6|6 A2 | End | 17,943,024 bp |
RNA expression pattern
| Bgee | Human / Mouse (ortholog); Top expressed in: ventricular zone; ganglionic eminence; cerebellar hemisphere; body of pancreas; popliteal artery; tibial arteries; right hemisphere of cerebellum; right coronary artery; right lung; islet of Langerhans / Top expressed in: saccule; otic placode; otic vesicle; genital tubercle; secondary oocyte; ventricular zone; zygote; spermatocyte; ganglionic eminence; tail of embryo; More reference expression data |
| BioGPS | n/a |
Orthologs
| Species | Human | Mouse |
| Entrez | 7982 | 64213 |
| Ensembl | ENSG00000004866 | ENSMUSG00000029534 |
| UniProt | Q9NRC1 | Q99M96 |
| RefSeq (mRNA) | NM_021908; NM_018412 | NM_001083315; NM_001289624; NM_001289625; NM_001289626; NM_001289627 NM_001289629; NM_022332 |
| RefSeq (protein) | NP_060882; NP_068708; NP_001356527; NP_001356528; NP_001356529 NP_001356530; NP_001356531; NP_001356532; NP_001356533; NP_001356535; NP_001356536 | NP_001076784; NP_001276553; NP_001276554; NP_001276555; NP_001276556 NP_001276558; NP_071727 |
| Location (UCSC) | Chr 7: 116.95 – 117.23 Mb | Chr 6: 17.69 – 17.94 Mb |
| PubMed search |
- Wikidata
| View/Edit Human | View/Edit Mouse |

Suppressor of tumorigenicity protein 7 is a protein that in humans is encoded by the ST7 gene. ST7 orthologs have been identified in all mammals for which complete genome data are available.

== Function ==
The gene for this product maps to a region on human chromosome 7 identified as an autism-susceptibility locus. Mutation screening of the entire coding region in autistic individuals failed to identify phenotype-specific variants, suggesting that coding mutations for this gene are unlikely to be involved in the etiology of autism. The function of this gene product has not been determined. Transcript variants encoding different isoforms of this protein have been described.

== Interactions ==
ST7 has been shown to interact with ITGB1BP3 and GNB2L1.
