= Nicotinamide phosphoribosyltransferase =

Human protein and coding gene

NAMPT
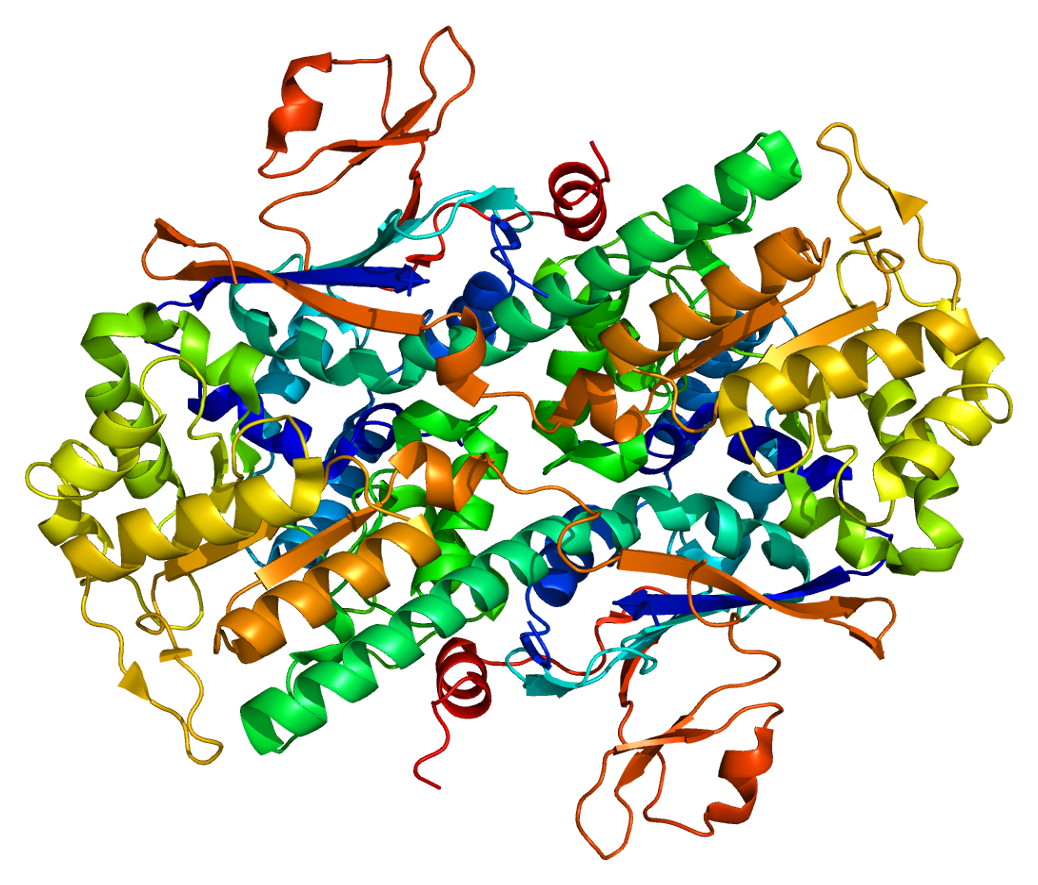

Identifiers
- Aliases: NAMPT, 1110035O14Rik, PBEF, PBEF1, VF, VISFATIN, nicotinamide phosphoribosyltransferase
- External IDs: OMIM: 608764; MGI: 1929865; GeneCards: NAMPT
Available structures
PDB	Ortholog search: PDBe RCSB
PDB	List of PDB id codes 2E5B, 2E5C, 2E5D, 2GVG, 2GVJ, 3DGR, 3DHD, 3DHF, 3DKJ, 3DKL, 4JNM, 4JR5, 4KFN, 4KFO, 4KFP, 4L4L, 4L4M, 4LTS, 4LV9, 4LVA, 4LVB, 4LVD, 4LVF, 4LVG, 4LWW, 4M6P, 4M6Q, 4N9B, 4N9C, 4N9D, 4N9E, 4O0Z, 4O10, 4O12, 4O13, 4O14, 4O15, 4O16, 4O17, 4O18, 4O19, 4O1A, 4O1B, 4O1C, 4O1D, 4O28, 4WQ6
Enzyme activity
EC #	BRENDA	ExPASy	KEGG	MetaCyc
2.4.2.12	↗	↗	↗	↗

Gene location (Human)
Chr.	Chromosome 7 (human)
Band	7q22.3	Start	106,248,298 bp
Band	7q22.3	End	106,285,966 bp

Gene location (Mouse)
Chr.	Chromosome 12 (mouse)
Band	12|12 A3	Start	32,869,544 bp
Band	12|12 A3	End	32,903,348 bp
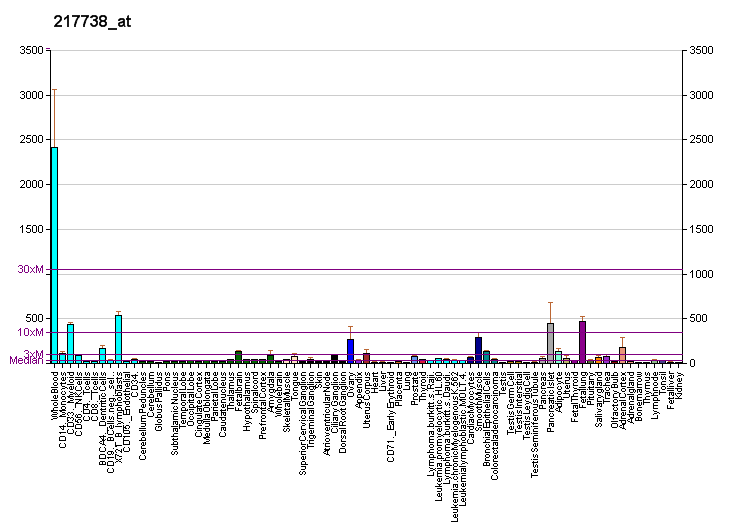

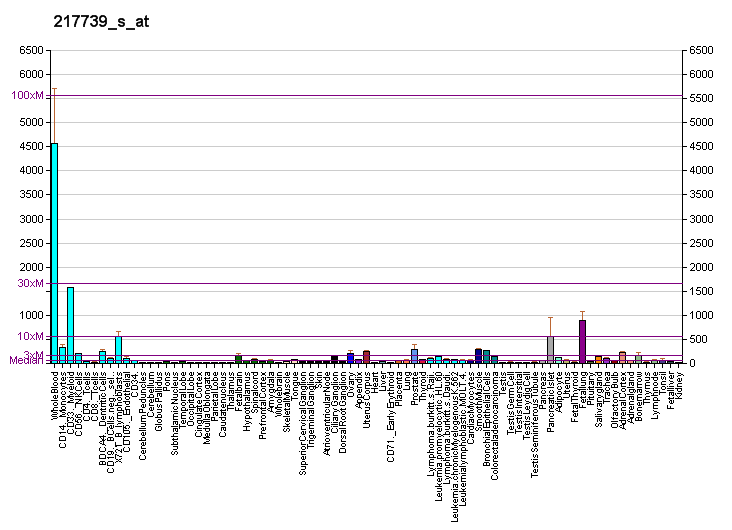
RNA expression pattern
Bgee	Human / Mouse (ortholog); Top expressed in: blood; pericardium; gastric mucosa; right lung; vena cava; upper lobe of left lung; left uterine tube; tail of epididymis; lower lobe of lung; gallbladder / Top expressed in: gastrula; decidua; temporal muscle; triceps brachii muscle; iris; sternocleidomastoid muscle; digastric muscle; vastus lateralis muscle; myocardium of ventricle; interventricular septum; More reference expression data
BioGPS	More reference expression data
Gene ontology
Molecular function	transferase activity; cytokine activity; protein homodimerization activity; glycosyltransferase activity; protein binding; nicotinate-nucleotide diphosphorylase (carboxylating) activity; nicotinamide phosphoribosyltransferase activity; identical protein binding; catalytic activity
Cellular component	cytoplasm; cytosol; extracellular region; cell junction; extracellular exosome; nucleus; extracellular space; nuclear speck; plasma membrane
Biological process	pyridine nucleotide biosynthetic process; insulin receptor signaling pathway; response to organic cyclic compound; NAD biosynthetic process; rhythmic process; female pregnancy; cell-cell signaling; positive regulation of nitric-oxide synthase biosynthetic process; circadian regulation of gene expression; circadian rhythm; positive regulation of cell population proliferation; adipose tissue development; positive regulation of transcription by RNA polymerase II; positive regulation of smooth muscle cell proliferation; signal transduction; NAD biosynthesis via nicotinamide riboside salvage pathway; regulation of signaling receptor activity; microglial cell activation; ageing; negative regulation of autophagy; regulation of lung blood pressure; neuron death; cellular response to ionizing radiation; cellular response to oxygen-glucose deprivation; cellular response to amyloid-beta; response to D-galactose; negative regulation of cellular senescence
Sources:Amigo / QuickGO
Orthologs
Databases	NCBI: entry; OMA: entry
Species	Human	Mouse
Entrez	10135	59027
Ensembl	ENSG00000105835	ENSMUSG00000020572
UniProt	P43490	Q99KQ4
RefSeq (mRNA)	NM_005746; NM_182790	NM_021524
RefSeq (protein)	NP_005737	NP_067499
Location (UCSC)	Chr 7: 106.25 – 106.29 Mb	Chr 12: 32.87 – 32.9 Mb
PubMed search
- Wikidata
View/Edit Human	View/Edit Mouse

nicotinamide phosphoribosyltransferase

Identifiers
- EC no.: 2.4.2.12
- CAS no.: 9030-27-7

Databases
- BRENDA: enzyme data
- ExPASy: NiceZyme view
- KEGG: enzyme entry
- MetaCyc: metabolic pathway
- Rhea: reactions
- PDB structures: RCSB PDB PDBe PDBsum
- Gene Ontology: AmiGO / QuickGO
Search
- PMC: articles
- PubMed: articles
- NCBI: proteins

Nicotinamide phosphoribosyltransferase (NAmPRTase or NAMPT), formerly known as pre-B-cell colony-enhancing factor 1 (PBEF1) or visfatin for its extracellular form (eNAMPT), is an enzyme that in humans is encoded by the NAMPT gene. The intracellular form of this protein (iNAMPT) is the rate-limiting enzyme in the nicotinamide adenine dinucleotide (NAD+) salvage pathway that converts nicotinamide to nicotinamide mononucleotide (NMN) which is responsible for most of the NAD+ formation in mammals. iNAMPT can also catalyze the synthesis of NMN from phosphoribosyl pyrophosphate (PRPP) when ATP is present. eNAMPT has been reported to be a cytokine (PBEF) that activates TLR4, that promotes B cell maturation, and that inhibits neutrophil apoptosis.

== Function ==
Nicotinamide phosphoribosyltransferase (iNAMPT) catalyzes the condensation of phosphoribosyl pyrophosphate with nicotinamide (NAM) to yield nicotinamide mononucleotide (NMN) and pyrophosphate (PP_{i}). This is the first step in the biosynthesis of nicotinamide adenine dinucleotide (NAD+). This reaction allows a salvage pathway, in which NAM is recycled from enzymes that use NAD+ (sirtuins, PARPs, CD38) as these produce NAM as a waste product. Thus this reaction is a major source of NAD+ production in the body. De novo synthesis of NAD+ from tryptophan occurs only in the liver and kidney, overwhelmingly in the liver.

phosphoribosyl pyrophosphate
+
nicotinamide
PP_{i}
PP_{i}
nicotinamide mononucleotide

The enzyme is categorised as a glycosyltransferase.

== Expression and regulation ==
The liver has the highest iNAMPT activity of any organ, about 10-20 times greater activity than kidney, spleen, heart, muscle, brain or lung. iNAMPT is downregulated by an increase of miR-34a in obesity via a 3'UTR functional binding site of iNAMPT mRNA resulting in a reduction of NAD(+) and decreased SIRT1 activity.

Endurance-trained athletes have twice the expression of iNAMPT in skeletal muscle compared with sedentary type 2 diabetic persons. In a six-week study comparing legs trained by endurance exercise with untrained legs, iNAMPT was increased in the endurance-trained legs. A study of 21 young (under 36) and 22 old (over 54) adults subject to 12 weeks of aerobic and resistance exercise showed aerobic exercise to increase skeletal muscle iNAMPT 12% and 28% in young and old (respectively) and resistance exercise to increase skeletal muscle iNAMPT 25% and 30% in young and old (respectively).

Aging, obesity, and chronic inflammation all reduce iNAMPT (and consequently NAD+) in multiple tissues, and NAMPT activity was shown to promote a proinflammatory transcriptional reprogramming of immune cells (e.g. macrophages) and brain-resident astrocytes.

== Nomenclature ==
The systematic name of this enzyme class is nicotinamide-nucleotide:diphosphate phospho-alpha-D-ribosyltransferase. Other names in common use include:

- NMN pyrophosphorylase,
- nicotinamide mononucleotide pyrophosphorylase,
- nicotinamide mononucleotide synthetase, and
- NMN synthetase.

== Extracellular NAMPT ==
Extracellular NAMPT (eNAMPT) is functionally different from intracellular NAMPT (iNAMPT), and less well understood (which is why the enzyme has been given so many names: NAMPT, PBEF and visfatin). iNAMPT is secreted by many cell types (nobably adipocytes) to become eNAMPT. The sirtuin 1 (SIRT1) enzyme is required for eNAMPT secretion from adipose tissue. eNAMPT may act more as a cytokine, although its receptor (possibly TLR4) has not been proven. It has been demonstrated that eNAMPT could bind to and activate TLR4.

eNAMPT can exist as a dimer or as a monomer, but is normally a circulating dimer. As a monomer, eNAMPT has pro-inflammatory effects that are independent of NAD+, whereas the dimeric form of eNAMPT protects against these effects.

eNAMPT/PBEF/visfatin was originally cloned as a putative cytokine shown to enhance the maturation of B cell precursors in the presence of Interleukin-7 (IL-7) and stem cell factor, it was therefore named "pre-B cell colony-enhancing factor" (PBEF). When the gene encoding the bacterial nicotinamide phosphoribosyltransferase (nadV) was first isolated in Haemophilus ducreyi, it was found to exhibit significant homology to the mammalian PBEF gene. Rongvaux et al. demonstrated genetically that the mouse PBEF gene conferred Nampt enzymatic activity and NAD-independent growth to bacteria lacking nadV. Revollo et al. determined biochemically that the mouse PBEF gene product encodes an eNAMPT enzyme, capable of modulating intracellular NAD levels. Others have since confirmed these findings. More recently, several groups have reported the crystal structure of Nampt/PBEF/visfatin and they all show that this protein is a dimeric type II phosphoribosyltransferase enzyme involved in NAD biosynthesis.

eNAMPT has been shown to be more enzymatically active than iNAMPT, supporting the proposal that eNAMPT from adipose tissue enhances NAD+ in tissues with low levels of iNAMPT, notably pancreatic beta cells and brain neurons.

=== Hormone claim retracted ===
Although the original cytokine function of PBEF has not been confirmed to date, others have since reported or suggested a cytokine-like function for this protein. In particular, Nampt/PBEF was recently re-identified as a "new visceral fat-derived hormone" named visfatin. It is reported that visfatin is enriched in the visceral fat of both humans and mice and that its plasma levels increase during the development of obesity. Noteworthy is that visfatin is reported to exert insulin-mimetic effects in cultured cells and to lower plasma glucose levels in mice by binding to and activating the insulin receptor. However, the physiological relevance of visfatin is still in question because its plasma concentration is 40 to 100-fold lower than that of insulin despite having similar receptor-binding affinity. In addition, the ability of visfatin to bind and activate the insulin-receptor has yet to be confirmed by other groups.

On 26 October 2007, A. Fukuhara (first author), I.Shimomura (senior author) and the other co-authors of the paper, who first described Visfatin as a visceral-fat derived hormone that acts by binding and activating the insulin receptor, retracted the entire paper at the suggestion of the editor of the journal 'Science' and recommendation of the Faculty Council of Osaka University Medical School after a report of the Committee for Research Integrity.

== As a drug target ==
NAMPT has increasingly been researched as a potential drug target, with activators of NAMPT having potential applications as anti-aging drugs, while inhibitors of NAMPT may be useful for the treatment of certain forms of cancer.

Because cancer cells utilize increased glycolysis, and because NAD enhances glycolysis, iNAMPT is often amplified in cancer cells. APO866 (FK866) is an experimental drug that inhibits this enzyme. It was tested for treatment of advanced melanoma, cutaneous T-cell lymphoma (CTL), and refractory or relapsed B-chronic lymphocytic leukemia, but was dropped from development due to disappointing efficacy results in trials. However, it has been shown to inhibit epithelial–mesenchymal transition (EMT) and inhibit tumor-associated angiogenesis, and may be useful for other medical indications.

Anti-aging biomedical company Calico has licensed the experimental P7C3 analogs involved in enhancing iNAMPT activity. P7C3 compounds have been shown in a number of publications to be beneficial in animal models for age-related neurodegeneration.

== Ligands ==
Activators

- C8 (NAMPT activator)
- JGB-1-155 (positive allosteric modulator)
- Myricanol
- P7C3
- SBI-797812

Inhibitors

- A-1293201
- CHS-828
- Daporinad (FK866/APO866)
- GNE-617
- Padnarsertib (KPT-9274)
- STF-118804
