= Nicotinamide mononucleotide =

Names
- IUPAC name 3-Carbamoyl-1-(5-O-phosphono-β-D-ribofuranosyl)pyridin-1-ium
- Systematic IUPAC name [(2R,3S,4R,5R)-5-(3-Carbamoylpyridin-1-ium-1-yl)-3,4-dihydroxyoxolan-2-yl]methyl hydrogen phosphate
- Other names: Nicotinamide ribonucleoside 5′-phosphate; Nicotinamide D-ribonucleotide; β-Nicotinamide ribose monophosphate; Nicotinamide nucleotide

Identifiers
CAS Number	1094-61-7
3D model (JSmol)	Interactive image
Beilstein Reference	3570187
ChEBI	CHEBI:16171
ChEMBL	ChEMBL610238
ChemSpider	13553
ECHA InfoCard	100.012.851
EC Number	214-136-5
KEGG	C00455
PubChem CID	16219737
UNII	2KG6QX4W0V
CompTox Dashboard (EPA)	DTXSID50911152
- InChI: InChI=1S/C11H15N2O8P/c12-10(16)6-2-1-3-13(4-6)11-9(15)8(14)7(21-11)5-20-22(17,18)19/h1-4,7-9,11,14-15H,5H2,(H3-,12,16,17,18,19)/t7-,8-,9-,11-/m1/s1 Key: DAYLJWODMCOQEW-TURQNECASA-N
- SMILES: c1cc(c[n+](c1)[C@H]2[C@@H]([C@@H]([C@H](O2)COP(=O)(O)[O-])O)O)C(=O)N

Properties
Chemical formula	C_{11}H_{15}N_{2}O_{8}P
Molar mass	334.221 g·mol^{−1}
- Except where otherwise noted, data are given for materials in their standard state (at 25 °C [77 °F], 100 kPa). Infobox references

Nicotinamide mononucleotide ("NMN" and "β-NMN") is a biosynthetic intermediate of nicotinamide adenine dinucleotide (NAD^{+}), synthesized from nicotinamide and 5′-phosphoribosyl-1-pyrophosphate by nicotinamide phosphoribosyltransferase (NAMPT) and also produced from nicotinamide riboside by nicotinamide riboside kinases. Conversion of NMN into NAD^{+} is catalyzed by nicotinamide mononucleotide adenylyltransferases (NMNATs). In mice, it has been proposed that NMN is absorbed via the small intestine within 10 minutes of oral uptake and converted to nicotinamide adenine dinucleotide (NAD+ form) through the Slc12a8 transporter. However, this observation has been challenged, and the matter remains unsettled.

Because NADH is a cofactor for processes inside mitochondria, for sirtuins and PARP, NMN has been studied in animal models as a potential neuroprotective and anti-aging agent. The alleged anti-aging effect at the cellular level by inhibiting mitochondrial decay in presence of increased levels of NAD+ makes it popular among anti-aging products. Dietary supplement companies have aggressively marketed NMN products, claiming those benefits. However, no human studies to date have properly proven its anti-aging effects with proposed health benefits only suggested through research done in vitro or through animal models. Single-dose administration of up to 500 mg was shown safe in men in a study at Keio University. One 2021 clinical trial found that NMN improved muscular insulin sensitivity in prediabetic women, while another found that it improved aerobic capacity in amateur runners. A 2023 clinical trial showed that NMN improves performance on a six-minute walking test and a subjective general health assessment.

NMN is vulnerable to extracellular degradation by CD38 enzyme, which can be inhibited by compounds such as CD38-IN-78c.

== Dietary sources ==
NMN is found in fruits and vegetables such as edamame, broccoli, cabbage, cucumber and avocado at a concentration of about 1 mg per 100g, making these natural sources impractical to acquire the quantities needed to accomplish the dosing.

== Synthesis in the body ==
NMN can be produced in the body directly from nicotinamide with the help of the enzyme nicotinamide phosphoribosyltransferase, or alternatively from nicotinamide riboside (a derivative of nicotinamide) through the application of a nicotinamide riboside kinase. In humans, there are two known forms of this enzyme: nicotinamide riboside kinase 1 (found across many tissues) and nicotinamide riboside kinase 2 (found mostly in muscles).

== Commercial production ==
Production of nicotinamide mononucleotide in the United States as a dietary supplement was prohibited in 2022 by the FDA because it is under investigation as a pharmaceutical drug. The FDA has now rescinded this determination for the β-NMN form.

== Different expressions of NMN across human organs ==
The synthesizing enzymes and consumption enzymes of NMN also exhibit tissue specificity: NMN is widely distributed in tissues and organs throughout the body and has been present in various cells since embryonic development.

== Pharmacological effect on human body ==
Latest studies of 2026 show that NMN alters human NAD metabolism significantly raising NAD levels if measured in whole-blood. The proposed route is microbial conversion in the gut to nicotinic acid, which then enters the Preiss-Handler pathway that red blood cells rely on NAD synthesis, although this has not yet been demonstrated directly in humans. The effect is faster than often assumed. In two volunteers sampled daily for 21 days on 1,000 mg/day orally, whole-blood NAD rose from a baseline of around 20 µM to 50–60 µM, with a half-time to saturation of around 3–4 days and saturation at 10–14 days. These findings show that NMN acts on human NAD metabolism, but provide no evidence of benefit from supplementation.

== Potential benefits and risks ==
NMN is a precursor for NAD^{+} biosynthesis, and NMN dietary supplementation has been demonstrated to increase NAD^{+} concentration and thus has the potential to mitigate aging-related disorders such as oxidative stress, DNA damage, neurodegeneration and inflammatory responses. The potential benefits and risks of NMN supplementation, as of 2023, are under investigation.

Certain enzymes are sensitive to the intracellular NMN/NAD^{+} ratio, such as SARM1, a protein responsible for initiating cellular degeneration pathways such as MAP kinase and inducing axonal loss and neuronal death. NMNAT is an enzyme with neurorescuing properties that functions to deplete NMN and produce NAD^{+}, attenuating SARM1 activity and aiding neuronal survival in vitro, an effect that is reversed by applying exogenous NMN which promptly resumed axon destruction. The similar molecule nicotinic acid mononucleotide (NaMN) opposes the activating effect of NMN on SARM1, and is a neuroprotector.
