= Ending Aging =

2007 book by Aubrey de Grey and Michael Rae

Ending Aging: The Rejuvenation Breakthroughs that Could Reverse Human Aging in Our Lifetime
- Author: Aubrey de Grey and Michael Rae
- Language: English
- Subject: Life extension
- Genre: Transhumanism
- Publisher: St. Martin's Press
- Publication date: September 2007; 19 years ago
- Publication place: United States
- Media type: Print (hardcover/paperback), audiobook
- Pages: 389/448
- ISBN: 978-0-312-36706-0
- OCLC: 132583222
- Dewey Decimal: 612.6/8 22
- LC Class: QP85 .D348 2007

Ending Aging: The Rejuvenation Breakthroughs that Could Reverse Human Aging in Our Lifetime is a 2007 book written by biogerontologist Aubrey de Grey, with his research assistant Michael Rae. Ending Aging describes de Grey's proposal for eliminating aging as a cause of debilitation and death in humans, and restoring the body to an indefinitely youthful state, a project that he calls the "strategies for engineered negligible senescence" ("SENS"). De Grey argues that defeating aging is feasible, possibly within a few decades, and he outlines steps that can be taken to hasten the development of regenerative medicine treatments for each side of aging.

== Editions ==
- St. Martin's Press, 1st edition (hardcover, 389 pages), released September 4, 2007: ISBN 0-312-36706-6
- St. Martin's Griffin, 1st reprint edition with new afterword (paperback, 448 pages), released October 14, 2008: ISBN 0-312-36707-4

== Translations ==
- German: Niemals alt!: So lässt sich das Altern umkehren. Fortschritte der Verjüngungsforschung, transcript Verlag, Bielefeld 2010
- Spanish: El Fin del Envejecimiento. Los avances que podrían revertir el envejecimiento humano durante nuestra vida, Lola Books, Berlín 2013
- Italian: La fine dell'invecchiamento: Come la scienza potrà esaudire il sogno dell'eterna giovinezza, D Editore, Roma 2016
- Portuguese: O fim do envelhecimento: Os avanços que poderiam reverter o envelhecimento humano durante nossa vida, NTZ, 2018

The book has not been officially translated into Russian, but there is an unofficial non-commercial fan translation named "Отменить Старение", which is distributed on the Internet in PDF format.

== See also ==
- Life extension
- Rejuvenation
- Longevity escape velocity
- SENS Research Foundation
- Methuselah Foundation
- Pro-aging trance
