= Longevity escape velocity =

Increasing remaining life expectancy faster than time passes

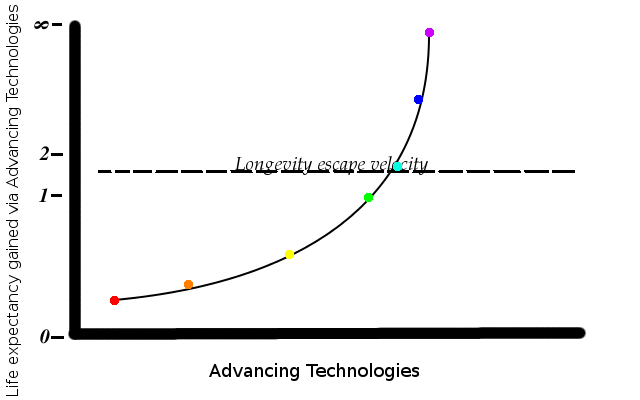
"The first 1000-year-old is probably only ~10 years younger than the first 150-year-old." –Aubrey de Grey, 2005

In the life extension movement, longevity escape velocity (LEV), actuarial escape velocity or biological escape velocity is when one's remaining life expectancy (not life expectancy at birth) is extended at a faster rate than time is passing. For example, in a given year in which longevity escape velocity would be maintained, medical advances would increase people's remaining life expectancy more than the year that just went by.

The term is meant as an analogy to the concept of escape velocity in physics, which is the minimum speed required for an object to indefinitely move away from a gravitational body despite the gravitational force pulling the object towards the body.

== Background ==
For many years in the past, life expectancy at each age has increased slightly every year as treatment strategies and technologies have improved. At present, more than one year of research is required for each additional year of expected life. Longevity escape velocity occurs when this ratio reverses, so that life expectancy increases faster than one year per one year of research, as long as that rate of advance is sustainable.

Mouse lifespan research has been the most contributive to conclusive evidence on the matter, since mice require only a few years before research results can be concluded.

== History ==
The term "longevity escape velocity" was conceived of by futurist David Gobel of the Methuselah Foundation and coined by biogerontologist Aubrey de Grey in a 2004 paper, but the concept has been present in the life extension community since at least the 1970s, such as in Robert Anton Wilson's essay Next Stop, Immortality. The concept is also part of the fictional history leading to multi-century youthful lifespans in the science fiction series The Mars Trilogy by Kim Stanley Robinson. More recent proponents include David Gobel, co-founder of the Methuselah Foundation and futurist, and technologist Ray Kurzweil, who named one of his books, Fantastic Voyage: Live Long Enough to Live Forever, after the concept. The last two claim that by putting further pressure on science and medicine to focus research on increasing limits of aging, rather than continuing along at its current pace, more lives will be saved in the future, even if the benefit is not immediately apparent.

The idea was further popularized with the publishing of Aubrey de Grey and Michael Rae's book Ending Aging in 2007. de Grey has also popularized the word "Methuselarity" which describes the same concept.

== Predictions ==
Ray Kurzweil predicts that longevity escape velocity will be reached before humanity realizes it. In 2018, he predicted that it would be reached in 10–12 years, meaning that the milestone would occur around 2028–2030. In 2024, writing for The Economist, Kurzweil revised his prediction to 2029–2035 and explained how artificial intelligence (AI) would help to simulate biological processes.

Aubrey de Grey has similarly predicted that humanity has a 50 percent chance of reaching longevity escape velocity in the mid-to-late 2030s.

When asked about reaching longevity escape velocity, the American geneticist George Church answered: "I wouldn't be surprised if 2050 would be a point."

The Australian geneticist David A. Sinclair believes that the first human who will live to 150 years has already been born.

== Criticism ==
Critics of the concept note that reaching longevity escape velocity would merely be an observation based on statistical data of a population's life expectancy; it neither means that everyone in a given population will have widespread access to the technology required to rejuvenate themselves nor that all non-aging-related causes of death will be eradicted.

== See also ==
- Life extension
- Post-aging society
- Pro-aging trance
- Technological utopianism
- Transhumanism
- Timeline of aging research
