= Strategies for engineered negligible senescence =

Proposed regenerative medical therapies

Strategies for engineered negligible senescence (SENS) is a range of proposed regenerative medical therapies, either planned or currently in development, for the periodic repair of all age-related damage to human tissue. These therapies have the ultimate aim of maintaining a state of negligible senescence in patients and postponing age-associated disease. SENS was first defined by British biogerontologist Aubrey de Grey. While scientists agreed with de Grey that "research into the basic biology of ageing needs and deserves more support", they also viewed de Grey's proposals "to 'engineer' the body to prevent ageing indefinitely" as a fringe theory. De Grey later highlighted similarities and differences of SENS to subsequent categorization systems of the biology of aging, such as the highly influential Hallmarks of Aging published in 2013.

While some biogerontologists support the SENS program, others contend that the ultimate goals of de Grey's programme are too speculative given the current state of technology. The 31-member Research Advisory Board of de Grey's SENS Research Foundation have signed an endorsement of the plausibility of the SENS approach.

== Framework ==
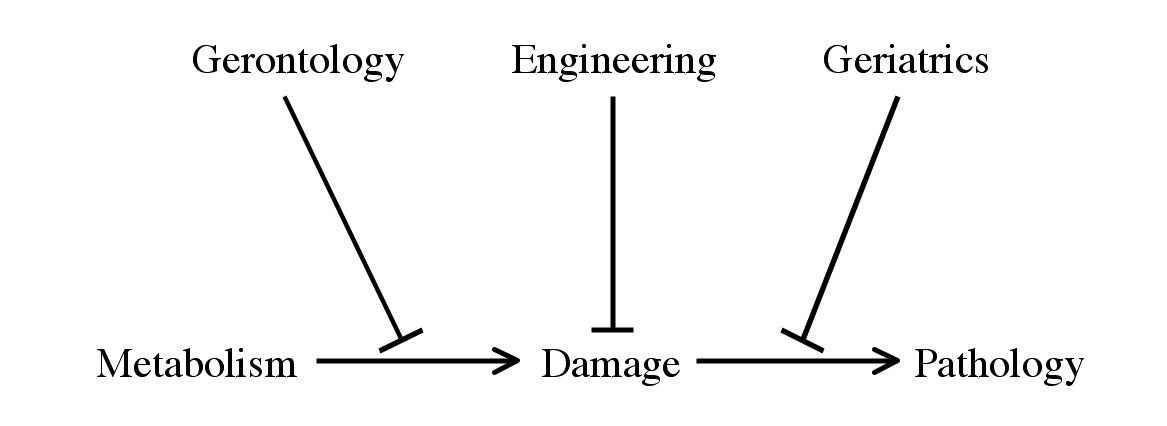
The arrows with flat heads are a notation meaning "inhibits", used in the literature of gene expression and gene regulation.

The term "negligible senescence" was first used in the early 1990s by professor Caleb Finch to describe organisms such as lobsters and hydras, which do not show symptoms of aging. The term "engineered negligible senescence" first appeared in print in Aubrey de Grey's 1999 book The Mitochondrial Free Radical Theory of Aging. De Grey defined SENS as a "goal-directed rather than curiosity-driven" approach to the science of aging, and "an effort to expand regenerative medicine into the territory of aging".

The ultimate objective of SENS is the eventual elimination of age-related diseases and infirmity by repeatedly reducing the state of senescence in the organism. The SENS project consists in implementing a series of periodic medical interventions designed to repair, prevent or render irrelevant all the types of molecular and cellular damage that cause age-related pathology and degeneration, in order to avoid debilitation and death from age-related causes.

=== Strategies ===
As described by SENS, the following table details major ailments and the program's proposed preventative strategies:

Issue	Proposed countermeasures
Extracellular aggregates	Immunotherapeutic clearance
Accumulation of senescent cells	Senescence marker-targeted toxins, immunotherapy
Extracellular matrix stiffening	AGE-breaking molecules, tissue engineering
Intracellular aggregates	Novel lysosomal hydrolases
Mitochondrial mutations	Allotopic expression of 13 proteins
Cancerous cells	Removal of telomere-lengthening machinery
Cell loss, tissue atrophy	Stem cells and tissue engineering

== Scientific reception ==
While some fields mentioned as branches of SENS are supported by the medical research community, e.g., stem cell research, anti-Alzheimers research and oncogenomics, the SENS programme as a whole has been a highly controversial proposal. Many of its critics argued in 2005 that the SENS agenda was fanciful and that the complicated biomedical phenomena involved in aging contain too many unknowns for SENS to be fully implementable in the foreseeable future.

Cancer may deserve special attention as an aging-associated disease, but the SENS claim that nuclear DNA damage only matters for aging because of cancer has been challenged in other literature, as well as by material studying the DNA damage theory of aging. More recently, biogerontologist Marios Kyriazis has criticised the clinical applicability of SENS by claiming that such therapies, even if developed in the laboratory, would be practically unusable by the general public. De Grey responded to one such criticism.

=== 2005 EMBO Reports statement ===
In November 2005, 28 biogerontologists published a statement of criticism in EMBO Reports, "Science fact and the SENS agenda: what can we reasonably expect from ageing research?," arguing "each one of the specific proposals that comprise the SENS agenda is, at our present stage of ignorance, exceptionally optimistic," and that some of the specific proposals "will take decades of hard work [to be medically integrated], if [they] ever prove to be useful." The researchers argue that while there is "a rationale for thinking that we might eventually learn how to postpone human illnesses to an important degree," increased basic research, rather than the goal-directed approach of SENS, is currently the scientifically appropriate goal.

== Technology Review contest ==
In February 2005, the MIT Technology Review published an article by Sherwin Nuland, a Clinical Professor of Surgery at Yale University and the author of How We Die, that drew a skeptical portrait of SENS, at the time de Grey was a computer associate in the Flybase Facility of the Department of Genetics at the University of Cambridge. While Nuland praised de Grey's intellect and rhetoric, he criticized the SENS framework both for oversimplifying "enormously complex biological problems" and for promising relatively near-at-hand solutions to those unsolved problems.

During June 2005, David Gobel, CEO and co-founder of the Methuselah Foundation with de Grey, offered Technology Review $20,000 to fund a prize competition to publicly clarify the viability of the SENS approach. In July 2005, Jason Pontin announced a $20,000 prize, funded 50/50 by Methuselah Foundation and MIT Technology Review. The contest was open to any molecular biologist, with a record of publication in biogerontology, who could prove that the alleged benefits of SENS were "so wrong that it is unworthy of learned debate." Technology Review received five submissions to its challenge. In March 2006, Technology Review announced that it had chosen a panel of judges for the Challenge: Rodney Brooks, Anita Goel, Nathan Myhrvold, Vikram Sheel Kumar, and Craig Venter. Three of the five submissions met the terms of the prize competition. They were published by Technology Review on June 9, 2006. On July 11, 2006, Technology Review published the results of the SENS Challenge.

In the end, no one won the $20,000 prize. The judges felt that no submission met the criterion of the challenge and discredited SENS, although they unanimously agreed that one submission, by Preston Estep and his colleagues, was the most eloquent. Craig Venter succinctly expressed the prevailing opinion: "Estep et al. ... have not demonstrated that SENS is unworthy of discussion, but the proponents of SENS have not made a compelling case for it." Summarizing the judges' deliberations, Pontin wrote in 2006 that SENS is "highly speculative" and that many of its proposals could not be reproduced with current scientific technology. Myhrvold described SENS as belonging to a kind of "antechamber of science" where they wait until technology and scientific knowledge advance to the point where it can be tested. Estep and his coauthors challenged the result of the contest by saying both that the judges had ruled "outside their area of expertise" and had failed to consider de Grey's frequent misrepresentations of the scientific literature.

== SENS Research Foundation ==
The SENS Research Foundation is a non-profit organization co-founded by Michael Kope, Aubrey de Grey, Jeff Hall, Sarah Marr and Kevin Perrott, which is based in California, United States. Its activities include SENS-based research programs and public relations work for the acceptance of and interest in related research.

== See also ==
- American Academy of Anti-Aging Medicine
- Biological immortality
- Calico
- Eternal youth
- Genetics of aging
- Geroprotector
- Indefinite lifespan
- Longevity escape velocity
- Maximum life span
- Protoscience
- Rejuvenation Research
- Senolytics
