= Rejuvenation Research =

- Discipline: Rejuvenation
- Language: English
- Edited by: Ben Zealley

Publication details
- Former name: Journal of Anti-Aging Medicine
- History: 1998–present
- Publisher: Mary Ann Liebert
- Frequency: Bimonthly
- Impact factor: 4.663 (2020)

Standard abbreviations
- ISO 4: Rejuvenation Res.

Indexing
- ISSN: 1549-1684 (print); 1557-8577 (web)
- LCCN: 2004214717
- OCLC no.: 54674277

Links
- Journal homepage; Online archives

Rejuvenation Research is a bimonthly peer-reviewed scientific journal published by Mary Ann Liebert that covers research on rejuvenation and biogerontology. The journal was established in 1998. The current acting editor-in-chief is Ben Zealley. It is the official journal of the European Society of Preventive, Regenerative and Anti-Aging Medicine as well as PYRAMED: World Federation and World Institute of Preventive & Regenerative Medicine.

The journal exhibited unusual levels of self-citation and its journal impact factor of 2019 was suspended from Journal Citation Reports in 2020, a sanction which hit 33 journals in total. However, the journal's 2020 impact factor was made available again in June 2021.

== History ==
The journal was established in 1998 as the Journal of Anti-Aging Medicine with Michael Fossel (Michigan State University) as editor-in-chief. It obtained its current title in 2004, when Aubrey de Grey took over as editor-in-chief. The current acting editor-in-chief is Ben Zealley.

=== SENS conferences ===
The journal publishes the abstracts of the biennial conferences of the SENS Research Foundation.

== Abstracting and indexing ==
Rejuvenation Research is abstracted and indexed in:

- MEDLINE
- Current Contents/Clinical Medicine
- Science Citation Index Expanded
- EMBASE/Excerpta Medica
- Scopus
- CAB Abstracts

== See also ==
- Strategies for engineered negligible senescence
- Timeline of senescence research
