= David Gobel =

American philanthropist, entrepreneur, inventor and futurist

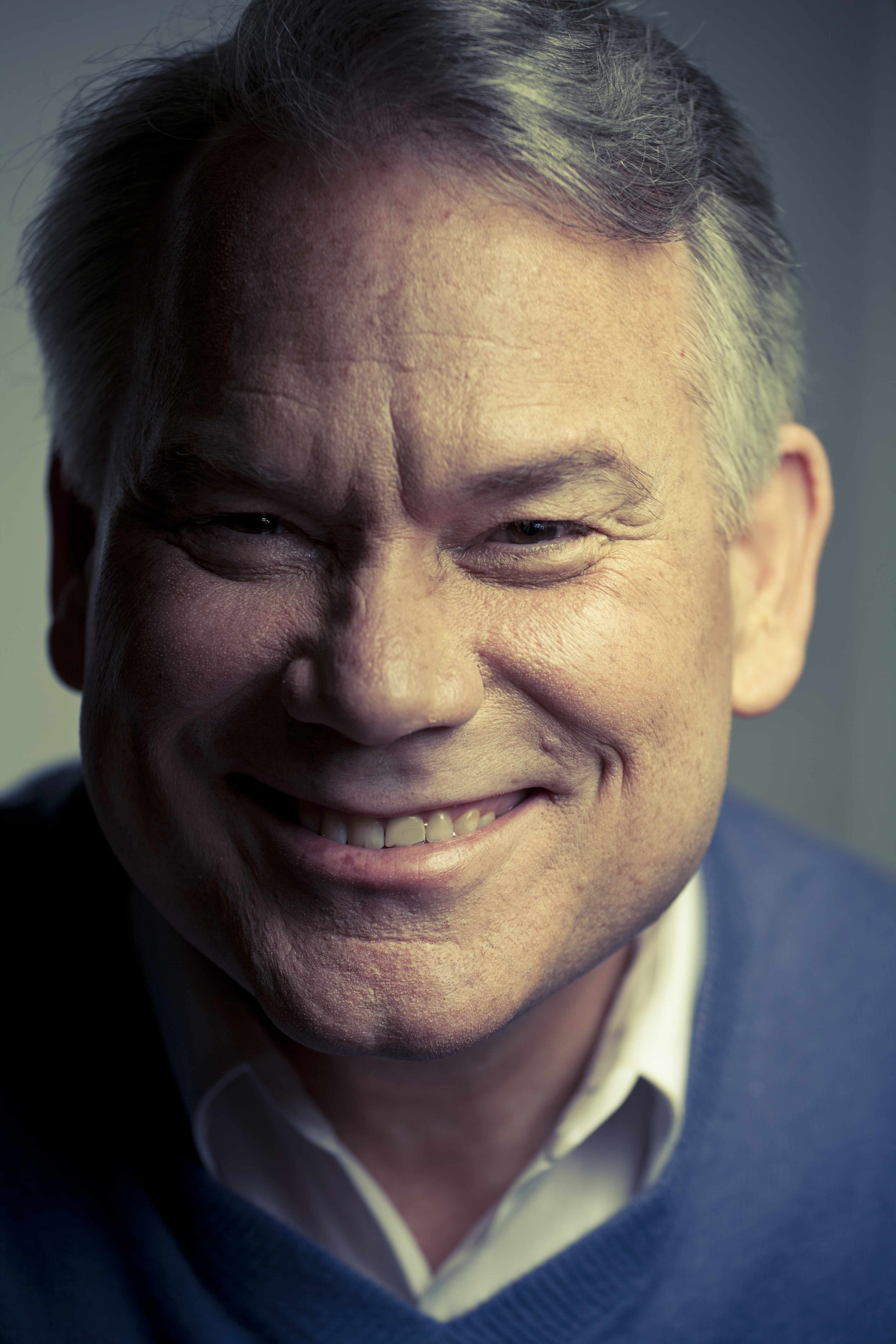
- Gobel in 2012
- Born: 1952 (age 73–74); Baltimore, Maryland, U.S.
- Occupations: Philanthropist; entrepreneur; inventor; futurist
- Known for: Co-founder and CEO of the Methuselah Foundation

David Gobel (born 1952 in Baltimore, Maryland) is an American philanthropist, entrepreneur, inventor, and futurist. He is co-founder and CEO of the Methuselah Foundation, CEO of the Methuselah Fund, and one of the first to publicly advance the idea of longevity escape velocity, even before this term was formulated.

== Career ==
=== Methuselah Foundation ===
David Gobel heads the Methuselah Foundation, a medical charity that was organized in 2000 and is based in Springfield, VA. Under Gobel's leadership, Methuselah has invested millions of dollars to support research and development in regenerative medicine, and is actively involved in efforts to change how the public thinks about extending the healthy human lifespan.

With co-founders Dane Gobel and Aubrey de Grey, Gobel established Methuselah in order to, as stated on its original website, "shed light on the processes of aging and find ways to extend healthy life."

The organization works in a variety of ways: Incubating companies that are developing breakthrough technologies, supporting mission-relevant ventures that promote longevity research, funding such research directly and supporting projects and prizes to accelerate breakthroughs in longevity.^{iii}

Through Methuselah, Gobel, and de Grey established research programs focused on advanced human bioremedial biology at Rice University and Arizona State University—the world's first use of environmental remediation techniques to be directed at reversing "pollution" in human cells.

Gobel also oversaw Methuselah's funding of the 2015 sequencing of the longest-lived mammal, the bowhead whale, which can live more than 200 years. The objective of this work was to identify any protective molecular adaptations within the species that may be relevant to age-related diseases, particularly cancer.^{iv}

In 2021, Methuselah contributed $1 million to Albert Einstein College of Medicine to fund the development of engineered replacement brain structures to correct age-related neurological damage without losing memories or self identity.^{v vi}

Gobel has directed Methuselah's investment in a variety of companies developing breakthrough technologies and clinical interventions in regenerative medicine. These companies include:

- Organovo, that does 3D tissue printing;
- Silverstone Solutions (acquired by BiologicTx in 2013), a maker of kidney-matching software that has saved thousands of lives by enabling hospitals and transplant organizations to more quickly and accurately pair patients with compatible donors, with compatible donors; BiologicTX was recently acquired by kidney-care giant Davita^{vii}
- Oisin Biotechnologies, which created an intervention to remove harmful senescent cells ("zombie cells") based on their DNA expression.
- Leucadia Therapeutics, a company developing a therapy to address Alzheimer's disease by restoring the flow of cerebrospinal fluid across the cribriform plate in the nasal cavity.
- OncoSenX, a spinout of Oisin, which is developing transient gene therapies that can fight solid tumors in cancers like lung and prostate^{viii}
- Volumetric^{ix}, whose 3D bioprinters and bio-inks can bioprint tissue 10 times faster than legacy printing methods. In 2021, the company was acquired by 3D Systems, a leader in 3D printing technology for healthcare and industrial uses.^{x}
- Turn Biotechnologies, which has developed a technology that can safely reprogram how DNA functions epigenetically, effectively restoring cell function that is typically lost as people age.^{xi}
- Repair Biotechnologies, which is developing treatments for aging and age-related diseases.^{xii} In 2021, company research showed its preclinical Cholesterol Degrading Platform significantly reversed obstruction of aortic blood vessels by lipid-based plaque in mice.^{xiii}
- Viscient Biosciences which is working to replace the use of animal research with 3D-printed, manufactured human tissue. The company's goal is to make medical testing more accurate than existing animal studies.^{xiv}
- X-Therma, which is developing breakthroughs to extend the shelf-life of organs from just a few hours to several days, which would reduce the organ shortage that severely restricts the number of transplants performed each year.^{xv}

Under Gobel, Methuselah has sponsored several competitions to encourage scientific innovation that can benefit longevity:

- In 2013, Methuselah launched the New Organ competition, to accelerate solutions to the global organ shortage. It promised a $1Million New Organ Liver Prize, to the first team that creates a bioengineered replacement for the native liver of a large mammal, enabling it to recover in the absence of native function and survive three months with a normal lifestyle.
- In 2016, a Methuselah collaborated with NASA to announce the Vascular Tissue Challenge, offering a $500,000 prize. Two teams were awarded prizes for their work in 2021.^{xvi}
- In 2021, Methuselah announced that a second collaboration with NASA, the Deep Space Food Challenge, awarded $25,000 prizes to each of 18 U.S. teams that designed a novel food production technology concept that maximizes safe, nutritious and palatable food outputs for long-duration space missions.^{xvii} The competition has entered a second round, in which teams must actually build their technology.^{xviii}

In addition, Gobel has overseen Methuselah's investment in and support of organizations whose mission has been to promote an environment that is supportive of life extension, including:

- The Organ Preservation Alliance, an initiative coordinating research, and stakeholders focused on the preservation of tissues and organs. In 2015, OPA became an independent tax-exempt non-profit organization.
- A 2013 partnership with Organovo to place #D bioprinters in several U>S. university research labs as springboards for cutting-edge for cutting-edge research.
- The Alliance for Longevity initiatives, whose mission it is to create social and political action around the issues of combatting age-related chronic conditions and increasing our number of healthy, disease-free years.^{xix} The organization seeks to build political, economic and scientific support for more longevity solutions.

=== SENS Research Foundation ===
Gobel was instrumental in the 2007 creation of a new rejuvenation research program called "Strategies for engineered negligible senescence" (SENS), to help identify, repair and remove cell-level damage before it causes systemic harm. Though Methuselah continues to provide support for years, SENS spun out as the independent SENS Research Foundation in 2009, and continues its work to use regenerative medicine to repair the damage underlying the diseases of aging.

=== Transportation Security Administration ===
As Chief Venture Strategist in the Office of Security Operations at TSA from 2002 to 2013, Gobel proposed, designed, and operated the Department of Homeland Security's first venture capital arm, which was focused on nurturing companies and technologies to modernize and automate security for the country.

He was responsible for multiple investments in cutting-edge security capabilities, including the VOXER iPhone app and the world's first hand-held mass spectrometer (aka 'Tricorder')

He also conceived and co-designed the IdeaFactory, DHS’s innovation management system. Using "wisdom of crowds" principles and bottom-up techniques to bring the experience and intelligence of 170,000 employees to bear on critical problems of security, efficiency and public service, IdeaFactory is featured on whitehouse.gov as an example of government innovation.

During his tenure at TSA, Gobel helped design and develop numerous other programs, including TSA’s Red Cell counter-terrorism group, the Arena XXI transportation security system, the Virtual Continuity of Operations conops, and TSA’s Information Technology Management Council.

=== Other ventures ===
Gobel is co-founder of the Supercentenarian Research Foundation.

He developed corporate and technology strategy at Eyegaze, a company that develops an advance eye-driven communication device.

From 1996 to 2002, Gobel was president of Obvious Software LLC, a venture project to design and build the world’s first fully independent artificial intelligence robotic online professional stock trading system. He also developed VastMind, a cloud-enabled parallel processing grid computing application to utilize wasted CPU cycles in broadband and LAN connected computers.

He co-founded Starbright in 1995, partnering with Steven Spielberg, Intel, Sprint, and Tandem Computers to design and create Starbright World, a broadband network that allowed sick kids at thousands of homes and over 110 children's hospitals to "go out and play" in a rich virtual world where they can communicate with friends and family.

He is also co-inventor of Worlds, Inc., one of the internet’s earliest shared 3D virtual worlds using avatar-based communication.

As co-founder and vice president of Knowledge Adventure, Inc. (1991–1994), Gobel invented "mouse movies" (now known as non-linear video) in which the movement of the user's mouse would link non-linearly to a database of video frames. At Knowledge Adventure, Gobel produced and directed 6 best-selling multimedia titles, including "3D Body Adventure," "Buzz Aldrin's Space Adventure," "Science Adventure," "America Adventure," "Bug Adventure," and "The Discoverers" by Daniel J. Boorstin.

== Articles ==
- Grady, Barbara, "Cyber 'play' to be used as therapy for hospital kids," Reuters News, November 7, 1995.
- "The Net 50", Newsweek, December 25, 1995.
- Moukheiber, Zina and Ben Pappas, "The geeks have inherited the earth," Forbes, 159(14): 348-355, July 7, 1997.
- Leake, Jonathan, "Science gets serious about elixir of life," The Sunday Times, August 31, 2003.
- Herrmann, Andrew, "Build a better, longer-living mouse, and world will pay you thousands," Chicago Sun-Times, October 6, 2003.
- Lamb, Gregory M. (12 January 2006). "'Grand challenges' spur grand results". Christian Science Monitor.
- Bauers, Sandy, "House vs. mouse; The latest ideas in humanely showing our disease-ridden fall visitors the door," The Philadelphia Inquirer, November 6, 2006.
- Preston, John (28 January 2007). "Who wants to live forever?". The Telegraph.
- "Eyes on the prize". The Economist. 3 January 2008.
- Markowitz, Eric (10 February 2012). "Investing in the Fountain of Youth". CNBC. Inc.
- Duggan, Alan, "Want to live forever? Mice could help…" Popular Mechanics, May 20, 2014.
- "Methuselah Foundation Announces Methuselah Prize Award to Dr. Huber Warner" (Press release). Methuselah Prize. 19 March 2022.
