= List of bitcoin organizations =

This is a list of nonprofit organizations with notable activities related to bitcoin.

Organization	Founded	Headquarters	Activities	Notes
Bitcoin Foundation	2012	US – Washington, D.C.	Advocacy	
BitGive Foundation	2013	US – Sacramento, California	Charity	
Pineapple Fund	2017		Charity	
