= Aubrey de Grey =

English biogerontologist and author (born 1963)

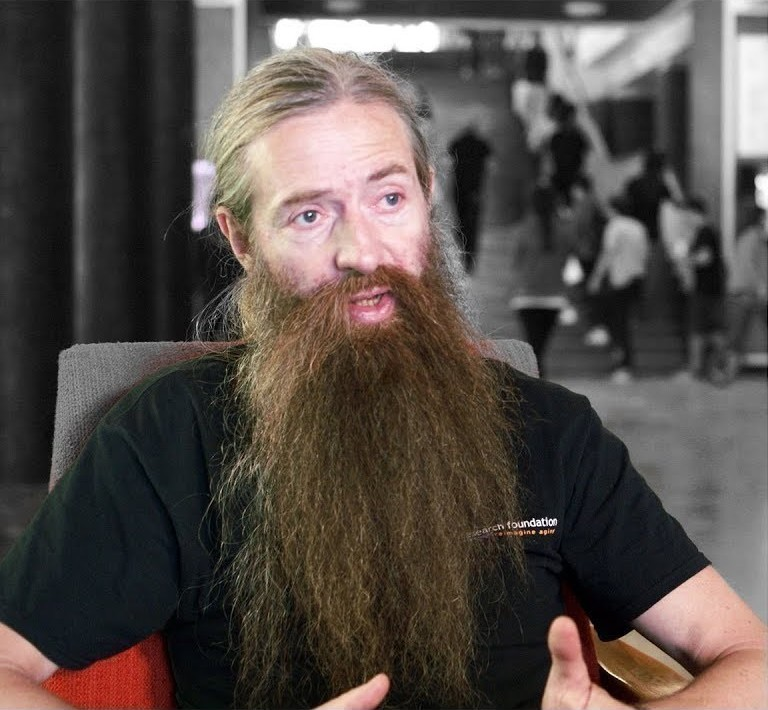
- De Grey in 2018
- Born: Aubrey David Nicholas Jasper de Grey; 20 April 1963 (age 63); London, England
- Education: Harrow School; Trinity Hall, Cambridge (BA, PhD)
- Occupations: President and CSO of LEVF
- Known for: Biogerontology; Hadwiger–Nelson problem; Methuselah Foundation; SENS Research Foundation; Strategies for engineered negligible senescence (SENS)
- Spouse: Adelaide Carpenter (m. 1991; div. 2017)

Aubrey David Nicholas Jasper de Grey (/dəˈɡreɪ/; born 20 April 1963) is an English biomedical gerontologist. He is the author of The Mitochondrial Free Radical Theory of Aging (1999) and co-author of Ending Aging (2007). De Grey is known for his view that medical technology may enable human beings alive today not to die from age-related causes. As an amateur mathematician, he contributed to the study of the Hadwiger–Nelson problem in geometric graph theory, making the first progress on the problem in over 60 years.

In 2003 he co-founded the Methuselah Foundation and stepped away from it around 2009. In 2009 he co-founded the SENS Research Foundation and served as its Chief Science Officer until 2021, when he departed after allegedly attempting to interfere in a probe investigating sexual harassment allegations against him.

In 2013, De Grey worked as an international adjunct professor of the Moscow Institute of Physics and Technology.

De Grey is President and Chief Science Officer of the Longevity Escape Velocity Foundation and editor of the Rejuvenation Research journal.

== Early life and education ==
De Grey was born on 20 April 1963 and brought up in London, England. He told The Observer that he never knew his father, and that his mother Cordelia, an artist, encouraged him in the areas in which she herself was weakest: science and mathematics. De Grey was educated at Sussex House School and Harrow School. He attended university at Trinity Hall, Cambridge, graduating with a BA in computer science in 1985.

== Career ==
After graduation in 1985, de Grey joined Sinclair Research as an artificial intelligence (AI) researcher and software engineer. In 1986, along with SRL colleague Aaron Turner, he co-founded Man-Made Minions Ltd. in order to pursue the development of an automated formal program verifier. At a graduate party in Cambridge, de Grey met fruit fly geneticist Adelaide Carpenter, whom he would marry in 1991. Through her, he was introduced to the intersection of biology and programming when her boss needed someone who knew about computers and biology to take over the running of a database on fruit flies. In the early 1990s, he switched fields from AI research to biomedical gerontology, after realising that "biologists by and large were not terribly interested in doing anything about aging". He educated himself in biology by reading journals and textbooks, attending conferences, and being tutored by Professor Carpenter. From 1992 to 2006, he was in charge of software development at the university's Genetics Department for the FlyBase genetic database.

Cambridge awarded de Grey a Ph.D. by publication in biology on 9 December 2000. The degree was based on his 1999 book The Mitochondrial Free Radical Theory of Aging, in which de Grey wrote that obviating damage to mitochondrial DNA might by itself extend lifespan significantly, though he said it was more likely that cumulative damage to mitochondria is a significant cause of senescence, but not the single dominant cause.

=== Strategies ===
In 2005, de Grey argued that most of the fundamental knowledge needed to develop effective anti-aging medicine already exists, and that the science is ahead of the funding. He described his work as identifying and promoting specific technological approaches to the reversal of various aspects of aging, or, as he puts it, "... the set of accumulated side effects from metabolism that eventually kills us."

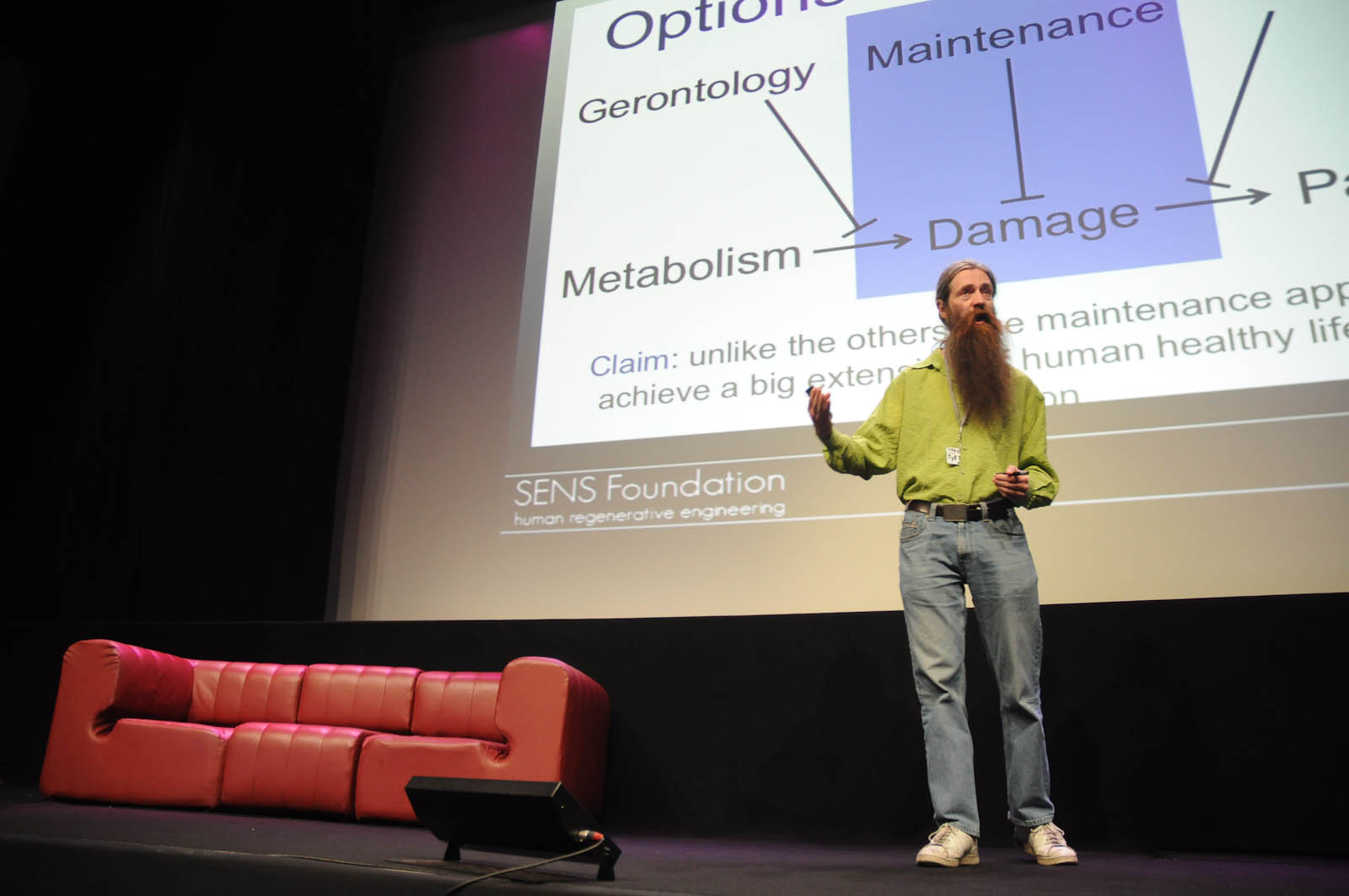
Aubrey de Grey explaining the SENS approach in a talk in 2010

As of 2005, de Grey's work centered on a detailed plan called strategies for engineered negligible senescence (SENS), which is aimed at preventing age-related physical and cognitive decline. In March 2009, he co-founded the SENS Research Foundation (named SENS Foundation until early 2013), a non-profit organisation based in California, United States, where he served until 2021 as Chief Science Officer. The foundation "works to develop, promote and ensure widespread access to regenerative medicine solutions to the disabilities and diseases of aging", focusing on the strategies for engineered negligible senescence. Before March 2009, the SENS research program was mainly pursued by the Methuselah Foundation, co-founded by de Grey.

A major activity of the Methuselah Foundation is the Methuselah Mouse Prize, a prize designed to incentivize research into effective life extension interventions by awarding monetary prizes to researchers who stretch the lifespan of mice to unprecedented lengths. De Grey stated in March 2005 "if we are to bring about real regenerative therapies that will benefit not just future generations, but those of us who are alive today, we must encourage scientists to work on the problem of aging." The prize reached US$4.2 million in February 2007.

In 2007, de Grey wrote the book Ending Aging with the assistance of Michael Rae.

In a 2008 broadcast on Franco-German TV network Arte, de Grey claimed that the first human to live 1,000 years was probably already alive, and might even be between 50 and 60 years old already.

In 2012, de Grey inherited more than US$16 million, US$13 million of which he donated to the SENS Research Foundation.

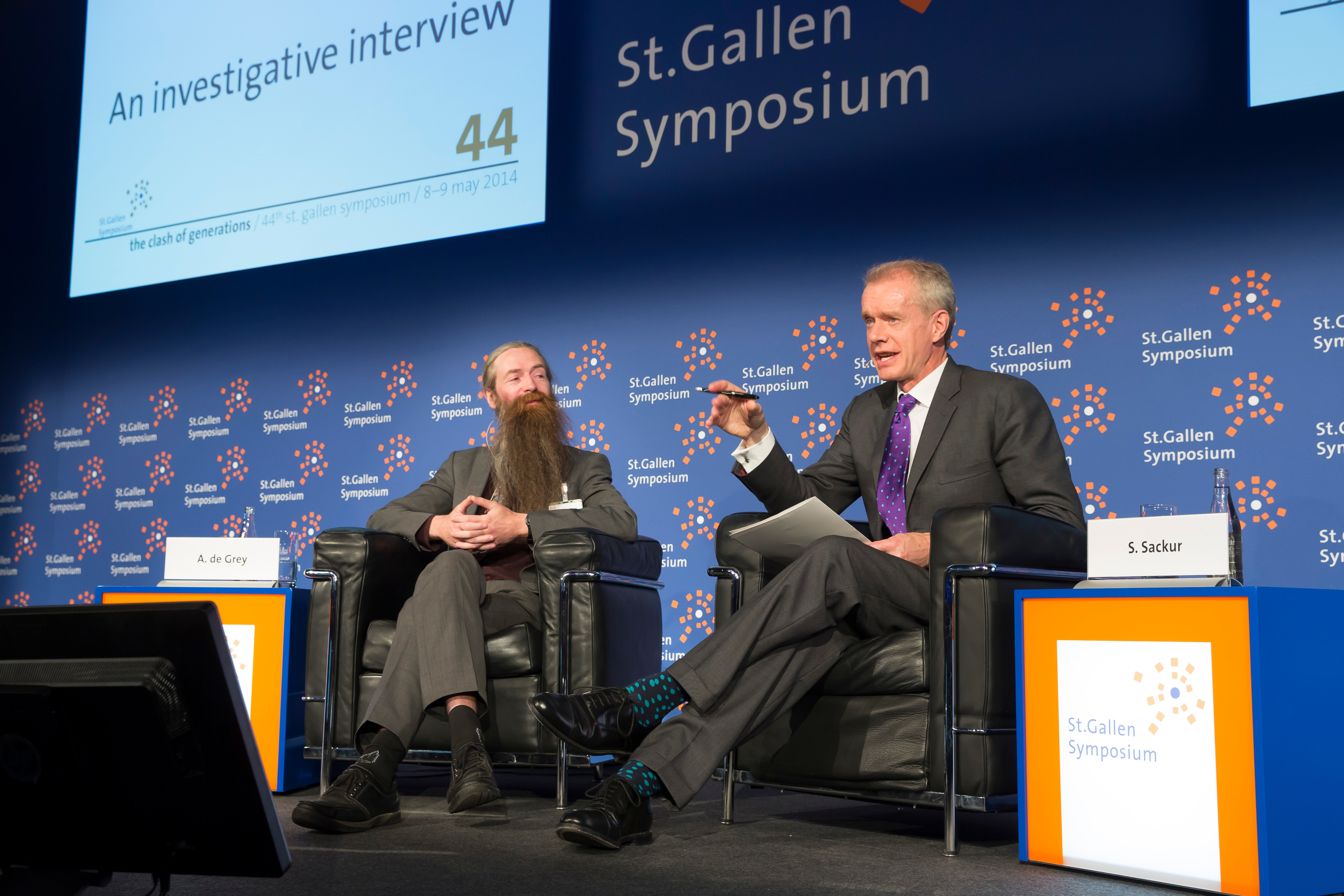
Aubrey de Grey during an interview with Stephen Sackur at the St. Gallen Symposium in 2014

In 2022, de Grey started the Longevity Escape Velocity Foundation, which funded and launched a project focusing on robust mouse rejuvenation.

=== Mathematics ===
On 8 April 2018, de Grey posted a paper to arXiv explicitly constructing a unit-distance graph in the plane that cannot be colored with fewer than five colors, increasing the previously known lower bound by one and making the first progress on the problem in over 60 years. The previous lower bound of four was due to the problem's original proposal in 1950 by Hugo Hadwiger and Edward Nelson. De Grey's graph has 1581 vertices, but it has since been reduced to 510 by independent researchers.

=== AgeX Therapeutics ===
De Grey was formerly Vice President of New Technology Discovery at AgeX Therapeutics, a startup in the longevity space helmed by Michael D. West. He was appointed to the position within the company in July 2017.

=== Xenocatabolism ===
Xenocatabolism is a concept in medical bioremediation that relies upon introducing into the body microbial enzymes that break down pathogenic lysosomal, cytosolic and extracellular aggregates. The term, also called xenohydrolysis, was coined by de Grey, building upon the work of others. De Grey posited that there are microbes that feed on substances such as amyloid, cholesterol and other related substances in places that are full of human remains, such as graveyards. This was based on the microbial infallibility hypothesis. He states that "the biomedical approach would be to identify the genetic basis for that capacity, and to put one or two genes into ourselves, thereby enhancing our own ability to break things down, and to thereby get rid of things that we cannot naturally break down". In order to add credibility to the concept, de Grey created an experiment using soil from a graveyard and took the bacteria from it. He used lipofuscin, "one of the major things that accumulates indigestibly in the body" – which some of the bacteria broke down, lending credibility to the hypothesis. De Grey presented this theory on May 29, 2007, at the Googleplex Google TechTalks.

== Views ==
=== Future of anti-aging medicine ===
De Grey believes that medical technology may enable human beings alive today not to die from age-related causes.

He coined the term Methuselarity, which he defines as the moment when medical therapies will rejuvenate people enough to continue living healthily until the next improved generation of rejuvenation biotechnology, and so on, indefinitely. According to de Grey, that is synonymous with the point where science achieves longevity escape velocity–the minimum rate at which those therapies need to be improved in order to allow people not to suffer from age-related ill-health at any age. In 2022, he stated that there is a 50% chance that this breakthrough was only 15 years away.

However, de Grey views the fatalistic attitude toward aging in society, as he sees it, as a hurdle in the rapid development of anti-aging medicine, which he calls "pro-aging trance".

==== Technology Review debate ====
In 2005, MIT Technology Review, in cooperation with the Methuselah Foundation, announced a US$20,000 prize for any molecular biologist who could demonstrate that SENS was "so wrong that it is unworthy of learned debate." The judges of the challenge were Rodney Brooks, Anita Goel, Vikram Sheel Kumar, Nathan Myhrvold, and Craig Venter. Five submissions were made, of which three met the terms of the challenge. De Grey wrote a rebuttal to each submission, and the challengers wrote responses to each rebuttal. The judges concluded that none of the challengers had disproved SENS, but the magazine opined that Preston Estep's submission was particularly eloquent and well written, and awarded the contestant US$10,000. The judges also noted "the proponents of SENS have not made a compelling case for SENS", and wrote that many of its proposals could not be verified with the current level of scientific knowledge and technology, concluding that "SENS does not compel the assent of many knowledgeable scientists; but neither is it demonstrably wrong." The critics single out three proposed therapies for criticism: somatic telomerase deletion, somatic mitochondrial genome engineering, and the use of transgenic microbial hydrolase.

Later in 2005, he was the subject of an associated critical editorial article in the MIT Technology Review, which viewed his theories as oversimplifying anti-aging as a scientific goal, and expressed concern at a lack of ethical and moral considerations towards anti-aging research.

==== EMBO Reports ====
A 2005 article about SENS published in the viewpoint section of EMBO Reports by 28 scientists concluded that none of de Grey's hypotheses "have ever been shown to extend the lifespan of any organism, let alone humans". The SENS Research Foundation, of which de Grey was a co-founder, acknowledged this, stating, "If you want to reverse the damage of aging right now I'm afraid the simple answer is, you can't." Moreover, de Grey argued that this reveals a serious gap in understanding between basic scientists and technologists and between biologists studying aging and those studying regenerative medicine.

The 31-member Research Advisory Board of de Grey's SENS Research Foundation have signed an endorsement of the plausibility of the SENS approach. In 2021, the National Institute on Aging (NIA), a division of the U.S. National Institutes of Health (NIH), showcased a SENS research project and provided a grant for the research.

=== Future of work ===
According to de Grey, automation will take over most jobs in the future. He also believes that the introduction of a universal basic income will be necessary to find "some new way to distribute wealth that doesn’t depend on being paid to do things we wouldn’t otherwise do".

=== Cryonics ===
De Grey is a cryonicist, having signed up with Alcor. When asked in an interview about his views on cryonics, he answered that "[...] it's an absolute tragedy that cryonics is still such a backwater publicly and that a large majority of people still believe that it has no chance of ever working", arguing "If people understood it better, there would be more research done to develop better cryopreservation technologies, and more people would have a chance at life."

== Sexual harassment allegations and aftermath ==
In August 2021, following allegations of sexual harassment by two women, de Grey was put on administrative leave by the SENS Research Foundation (SRF). The SRF board of directors decided to remove de Grey from his position as chief science officer, severing all ties with him following the report that he had allegedly attempted to interfere with the investigation.

The independent investigator found that various other allegations against de Grey were not substantiated. However, the investigator determined that de Grey made inappropriate remarks to the two complainants. The investigator also decided de Grey's attempt to communicate with Halioua via a third party constituted interference, although de Grey stated he believed that phase of the investigation had concluded.

In March 2022, SRF released a statement regarding de Grey's employment affirming that while his actions "did substantiate instances of poor judgment and boundary-crossing behaviors, Dr. de Grey is not a sexual predator."

De Grey's removal from SRF led three major donors to sue SRF for fraud, where they alleged that at the time they had donated (July 2021) the SRF board was already engineering de Grey’s removal but had concealed this from the wider world. The donors said that had they known that de Grey would not be substantially responsible for disbursing donated funds they would not have donated. The suit was settled within three months and did not proceed to a discovery phase. The nature of the settlement was not made public, but de Grey has stated that the Longevity Escape Velocity Foundation, his new organization, was formed "as a result". Another lawsuit making similar accusations was filed by donor April Okita on November 21, 2024.

== Bibliography ==
- de Grey, Aubrey (1999). The Mitochondrial Free Radical Theory of Aging. Austin: R.G. Landes Company. ISBN 1-57059-564-X.
- de Grey, Aubrey, ed. (2004). Strategies for Engineered Negligible Senescence: Why Genuine Control of Aging May Be Foreseeable. Annals of the New York Academy of Sciences. ISBN 978-1573314961.
- de Grey, Aubrey; Rae, Michael (2007). Ending Aging: The Rejuvenation Breakthroughs that Could Reverse Human Aging in Our Lifetime. New York: St. Martin's Press. ISBN 978-0-312-36706-0. OCLC 132583222.
- Polymath, D. H. J. (April 2018). "Hadwiger-Nelson problem (Polymath project page)".
- de Grey, Aubrey D.N.J (April 2018). The chromatic number of the plane is at least 5. arXiv:1804.02385. Bibcode:2018arXiv180402385D.

== See also ==
- List of life extension topics
- Regenerative medicine
