= Pineapple Fund =

Philanthropic project

- Established: December 2017
- Founder: Anonymous / "Pine"
- Type: Charitable fund
- Budget: 5,057 bitcoins
- Disbursements: $55 million
- Website: https://pineapplefund.org/

The Pineapple Fund was a philanthropic project by an anonymous individual which gave away 5,057 bitcoins to 60 charities. The amount was valued at $86 million in December 2017. Some of the themes supported were medical research, environmental conservation, human rights and psychedelic therapy.

== History ==
The Pineapple Fund was announced with a post on Reddit on December 14, 2017. The individual used the pseudonym "Pine", and explained that "My aims, goals, and motivations in life have nothing to do with ... being the mega rich. So I'm doing something else: donating the majority of my bitcoins to charitable causes". The individual behind the fund has remained pseudonymous.

An application form was made available on the website, open to all charities around the world. Speaking to the magazine Philanthropy, the founder said that more than 10,000 applications were received.

After five months, a total of 5,104 bitcoins had been donated and liquidated for a value of $55 million after exchange rate volatility.

== Donations ==
- The fund's first donation was $1 million to Watsi, a charity for crowdfunding healthcare.
- The fund donated a total of $3 million to SENS Research Foundation and Methuselah Foundation for development of rejuvenation therapies based on periodic repair of the cell and tissue damage that causes aging.
- The fund made its three largest donations of $5 million each to GiveDirectly, The Open Medicine Foundation, and to MAPS.
- The fund donated $2 million to the Organ Preservation Alliance.
- The fund has also donated $1 million or more to organizations such as BitGive Foundation, OpenStreetMap, Internet Archive, and the Sustainable Ocean Alliance.
- The fund donated 88.34 Bitcoin (BTC) to The Apache Software Foundation, valued at $1M at the time of the donation.

== See also ==
- List of bitcoin organizations
