= David Gems =

British geneticist and biogerontologist

David Herbert Gems
- Born: 1960 (age 65–66); Weybridge, Surrey, United Kingdom
- Education: University of Sussex, University of Glasgow
- Scientific career
- Fields: Genetics, biogerontology
- Workplaces: University College London
- Thesis: Transformation and development of Aspergillus nidulans (1990)
- Doctoral advisor: A.J. Clutterbuck

David Gems is a British geneticist who studies the biology and genetics of ageing (biogerontology). He is Professor of Biogerontology at the Research Department of Genetics, Evolution and Environment, University College London and he is a co-founder and Research Director of the UCL Institute of Healthy Ageing. His work focuses on uncovering the underlying causes of aging. His research laboratory tests theories of aging and develops new ones using a short-lived animal model C. elegans.

== Early life and career ==
Gems went to Dartington Hall School before attending the University of Sussex, graduating in 1983 with a BSc in Biochemistry. After graduation in 1983, Gems pursued various work in Costa Rica, Nicaragua, Mexico and USA. He then returned to the UK, obtaining a PhD in Genetics from the University of Glasgow in 1990, working the genetics of development in Aspergillus nidulans.

In 1993 he moved to the University of Missouri Columbia and the lab of Don Riddle, discoverer of the gene daf-2 which controls lifespan, to work on C. elegans aging. In 1997 he set up his own research group at UCL, supported by a Royal Society University Research Fellowship. Subsequent expansion of research on aging at UCL led in 2007 to the creation of the Institute of Healthy Ageing (IHA), founded by Gems and Dame Linda Partridge, its first Director, with the support of the Wellcome Trust. In 2012 he was appointed Professor of Biogerontology, and in 2019 Research Director of the IHA.

== Research ==
From 1993 to 2014, much of Gems's work related to long-lived C. elegans daf-2 mutants and the defects in insulin/IGF-1 signaling that controls their lifespan. A key contribution concerned to whether this pathway controls aging in other animals (including humans). In collaborative work at UCL (2001-9), Gems contributed to showing that it does, in fruit flies (with Linda Partridge) and in mice (with Dominic Withers).

During the 2000s his work also focused on identifying the processes of aging itself that insulin/IGF-1 signaling controls, in an attempt to discover what really causes aging. The role of antioxidant defenses, and the validity of the oxidative damage theory of aging was tested in a series of studies from 2003 to 2012. This contributed to the demise of the oxidative damage theory of aging, which had guided research on aging for several decades, in 2008-2009.

From 2013 onwards, Gems's work explored new theories and experimental approaches for understanding aging, given what he claimed was the failure of prior research to understand C. elegans aging at the fundamental level. This included testing ideas from an emerging, new school of thought about the causes of aging, the programmatic theory (also known as the hyperfunction theory, and the developmental theory). This was developed by George C. Williams, Mikhail Blagosklonny, João Pedro de Magalhães and Dr Carina Kern. Gems performed a series of studies suggesting that age-related disease in C. elegans were the result of programmatic changes, rather than molecular damage accumulation, traditionally viewed as a main cause of aging

Gems has been an outspoken critic of what he argues are ideas that are inadequate to guide research towards an understanding of the aging process. These include the assumption that aging is caused by molecular damage, the disposable soma theory, the hallmarks of aging, which he branded a "pseudo-paradigm", and the concept of cellular senescence, which he argued has been outgrown by recent research progress.

His recent work has increasingly involved developing new theories of aging that extend the programmatic theory, including the existence of programmed adaptive death in colonial organisms, perhaps including C. elegans; the possibility that C. elegans exhibit reproductive suicide as seen in semelparous organisms such as Pacific salmon; and a multifactorial model, based on the programmatic model, and earlier ideas from the Russian gerontologist Vladimir Dilman, to explain the origins of diseases of aging.

He has written on the ethics of research on aging, mainly arguing against conservative objections to intervening in the aging process, and the traditional medical view that diseases of aging are something apart from the process of normal aging. He is said to be working (2023) on a book on developments in the science of ageing.

== Publications ==
- Clancy, David J.; Gems, David; Harshman, Lawrence G.; Oldham, Sean; Stocker, Hugo; Hafen, Ernst; Leevers, Sally J.; Partridge, Linda (6 April 2001). "Extension of Life-Span by Loss of CHICO, a Drosophila Insulin Receptor Substrate Protein". Science. 292 (5514): 104–106. Bibcode:2001Sci...292..104C. doi:10.1126/science.1057991. ISSN 0036-8075. PMID 11292874.
- Selman, Colin; Tullet, Jennifer M. A.; Wieser, Daniela; Irvine, Elaine; Lingard, Steven J.; Choudhury, Agharul I.; Claret, Marc; Al-Qassab, Hind; Carmignac, Danielle; Ramadani, Faruk; Woods, Angela; Robinson, Iain C. A.; Schuster, Eugene; Batterham, Rachel L.; Kozma, Sara C.; Thomas, George; Carling, David; Okkenhaug, Klaus; Thornton, Janet M.; Partridge, Linda; Gems, David; Withers, Dominic J. (2 October 2009). "Ribosomal Protein S6 Kinase 1 Signaling Regulates Mammalian Life Span". Science. 326 (5949): 140–144. Bibcode:2009Sci...326..140S. doi:10.1126/science.1177221. ISSN 0036-8075. PMC 4954603. PMID 19797661.
