= BitGive Foundation =

American nonprofit organization

- Company type: 501(c)(3) organization
- Headquarters: Truckee, California, U.S.
- Area served: Worldwide
- Key people: Connie Gallippi (founder & executive director); Rumi Morales (board president); Sandra Ro (board treasurer); Matthew Roszak (board member); Dawn Newton (board member); Paul Lamb (board member); Justin Steffen (board member)
- Website: bitgivefoundation.org

The BitGive Foundation is an American nonprofit organization that solicits bitcoin donations for use in charitable causes.

== Background ==
BitGive was established by Connie Gallippi in 2013. The organization was the first Bitcoin and Blockchain technology nonprofit. The organization has received 501(c)(3) tax exempt status from the United States Internal Revenue Service.

BitGive was founded with the goal of strengthening philanthropic impact globally by using cryptocurrency to make the process faster and more secure. On GiveTrack, nonprofits can post projects and donors can contribute funds. Contributions can be made in bitcoin or in dollars. The platform gives donors financial reporting and project results in real time.

In 2017–2018, BitGive received $1 million from the Pineapple Fund, a philanthropic endeavor by an anonymous donor known as “Pine,” who sought to donate “the majority of [their] bitcoins to charitable causes.”

== Partnerships ==
BitGive has worked with nonprofits globally, including Save the Children and The Water Project.

== Leadership ==
Connie Gallippi is a founder in the cryptocurrency space. In recognition of her work, Gallippi has been recognized on lists of notable women in cryptocurrency from publications, including Glamour, HuffPost, and the FinTech Times, among others. She serves on the board of directors for the Sierra Business Council. Gallippi holds a BS in Natural Resource Management from Virginia Tech.

BitGive's board of directors is composed of figures from the blockchain and cryptocurrency space: Rumi Morales (Board President), Sandra Ro (Board Treasurer), Matthew Roszak, Dawn Newton, Paul Lamb, and Justin Steffen. Emeritus board members include: Patrick Murck, Stephen Pair, and Alyse Killeen.
