= Adelaide Carpenter =

American fruit fly geneticist (1944–2024)

- Born: Adelaide T. C. Carpenter; June 24, 1944; Georgia, United States
- Died: May 31, 2024 (aged 79)
- Education: North Carolina State University University of Washington (Ph.D.)
- Known for: Discovery of the recombination nodule
- Spouse: Aubrey de Grey (m. 1991; div. 2017)
- Scientific career
- Workplaces: University of California, San Diego; University of Cambridge

Adelaide T. C. Carpenter (June 24, 1944 – May 31, 2024) was an American fruit fly geneticist at the University of Cambridge.

== Biography ==
Carpenter was born 24 June 1944, in Georgia, United States and grew up in North Carolina. She started graduate studies of the Genetics Department at the University of Washington, Seattle, in 1966. This was funded by a National Science Foundation Graduate Fellowship.

In the 1970s, whilst at the University of Washington, she was one of the numerous graduate students mentored by geneticist Larry Sandler. In 1976, she obtained a faculty position at the University of California, San Diego. She was the first woman at the university to be promoted to full professor. In 1989, after becoming full professor, she took a second sabbatical in the United Kingdom and became a part of the Medical Research Council Laboratory of Molecular Biology in Cambridge, England. She later join the University of Cambridge laboratory of biologist Michael Ashburner, and had remained in Cambridge for over 30 years. Along with Ashburner’s lab, she would later work with the labs of geneticist David Glover, and finally with the lab of Felipe Teixeira.

Carpenter died on May 31, 2024.

== Scientific work ==
In 1975, Carpenter discovered and published a paper on the recombination nodule, an organelle that mediates meiotic recombination.

== Media appearances ==
- The Immortalists (2014)
- Do You Want to Live Forever? (2007)
