= Vikram Sheel Kumar =

Indian-American engineer and entrepreneur

- Born: United States
- Education: Engineering
- Alma mater: Indian Institute of Technology, Columbia University, Harvard-MIT Division of Health Sciences
- Occupations: engineer, doctor, entrepreneur
- Father: Vijay Sheel Kumar

Vikram Sheel Kumar (born 1976) is an American engineer, doctor, and entrepreneur.

== Early life and education ==
Vikram Kumar was born in the United States to an Indian-American family. His father was a neurosurgeon. As a child, the family returned to India, where Kumar attended the Modern School in New Delhi. After graduation, he studied engineering at the Indian Institute of Technology.

In 1996, Kumar returned to the United States and received a BS in operations research from Columbia University in 1999. He then studied medicine and business at the Harvard-MIT Division of Health Sciences and Technology, which was supported by The Paul & Daisy Soros Fellowships for New Americans.

== Career ==
In 2002, Kumar co-founded Dimagi, a for-profit software company which develops open-source software technology for doctors in impoverished areas. Kumar is the company's Chief Medical Officer (CMO). He also co-founded Cogito Corp, a startup which uses a mobile-phone-based voice analysis system to determine the mental health patterns of patients, and Ozorie, which manufactures pain relief, rapid healing, and hair revival products.

In 2004, Technology Review named him one of the world's top 100 innovators under 35 in biotechnology and medicine, and awarded him the "Technology in the Service of Humanity" award. In 2005, he received the Ten Outstanding Young Americans (TOYA) award.

In 2005, Kumar was one of the judges on the MIT Technology Review contest, which found a series of proposed refutations of the strategies for engineered negligible senescence approach to biomedical gerontology had not succeeded.

In 2007, Kumar completed a residency as a clinical pathologist at Brigham and Women's Hospital. He then returned to India to help his ailing father, who owned Doctor Kares Hospital, a super-specialty hospital in New Delhi, manage his business. While in India, Kumar also founded another startup. After his father's death, he returned to Boston to better manage Dimagi.

In 2017, Kumar co-founded Clear Creek Bio to develop a dihydroorotate dehydrogenase (DHODH) inhibitor, called brequinar, for leukemia. The company is also studying brequinar as an oral antiviral drug for SARS-CoV-2. Kumar is the CEO of Clear Creek Bio. He lives in Boston, with his wife and two children.
