= Judith Campisi =

American biochemist (1948–2024)

- Born: March 12, 1948
- Died: January 19, 2024 (aged 75)
- Education: Stony Brook University
- Known for: Cellular senescence
- Awards: Longevity Prize from the Ipsen Foundation; Olav Thon Foundation Prize
- Scientific career
- Fields: Biogerontology
- Workplaces: Buck Institute; SENS Research Foundation; Lifeboat Foundation

Judith Campisi (March 12, 1948 – January 19, 2024) was an American biochemist and cell biologist. She was a professor of biogerontology at the Buck Institute for Research on Aging. She was also a member of the SENS Research Foundation Advisory Board and an adviser at the Lifeboat Foundation. She was co-editor in chief of the Aging Journal, together with Mikhail Blagosklonny and David Sinclair, and founder of the pharmaceutical company Unity Biotechnology. She is listed in Who's Who in Gerontology. She was widely known for her research on how senescent cells influence aging and cancer — in particular the Senescence Associated Secretory Phenotype (SASP).

== Career ==
Campisi was born on March 12, 1948. She got her B.A. in chemistry in 1974 and Ph.D. in biochemistry in 1979 (under mentor Carl Scandella) from the State University of New York at Stony Brook and completed her postdoctoral training at the Harvard Medical School in 1982. She initially joined the Boston University Medical School, and moved onto the Lawrence Berkeley National Laboratory as a Senior Scientist in 1991. She then moved to the Buck Institute in 2002.

== Research ==
Much of Campisi's work focuses on the complex relationship between cellular senescence, aging and cancer. Her research is leading to new discoveries in anti-cancer genes, DNA repair mechanisms, molecular pathways that protect cells against stress, and the role of stem cells in aging and age-related disease.

Cellular senescence was first formally observed in 1965 by Leonard Hayflick, who demonstrated that certain cells have limited ability to proliferate in-vitro. After several replications, certain cells can lose their ability to divide, but still remain functionally viable. These phenomena became known as cellular senescence, and could be viewed as both helpful and harmful to an organism; it could be helpful in a sense that the senescence could act as a powerful tumor-suppressive mechanism, but harmful in the sense that it could result in the accumulation of non-dividing cells in healthy tissues which could lead to impaired regenerative capacity and function. Campisi and others theorize that cellular senescence directly promotes aging, but evidence remains largely circumstantial.

The senescence response can be caused by a variety of factors. Telomere-dependent senescence is caused by the shortening of telomeres due to the end-replication problem of DNA replication. Dysfunctional telomeres trigger a classical DNA Damage Response, and are a major contributing factor to why many cells cannot replicate indefinitely without the presence of telomerase. DNA-damage-initiated senescence is caused by major DNA damage (usually double-stranded breaks) that trigger pathways that keep the cell from dividing. As expected, both telomere-dependent and DNA-damage-initiated senescence have been shown to involve similar pathways. Senescence can also be triggered by the presence of oncogenes or extracellular stress, but these mechanisms are not as well understood.

The two main pathways that control the senescence response in most cells are the p53 and p16-pRB tumor suppressor pathways. As a transcription regulator, the p53 protein activates the transcription factor p21, which results in the transcription of proteins that result in cellular senescence. Research has shown that the pathway is primarily activated by stimuli that generate a DNA Damage Response, and therefore is a common pathway for telomere-dependent senescence as well as DNA-Damage initiated senescence.

As a cyclin-dependent kinase inhibitor (CDKI), p16 works by down-regulating molecules that keep pRB in an active, hypophosphorylated form. This, in turn, keeps E2F from transcribing genes that are needed for cellular proliferation. The p16-pRB pathway can be activated by the DNA Damage Response, but is usually secondary to the p53 response in such cases. The p16-pRB pathway has instead been shown to primarily be active in other senescence-inducing pathways, especially in epithelial cells. Both pathways can result in transient or permanent cell-cycle arrests, but the exact mechanisms in which these processes differ are still unknown.

Much less is known about the relationship between cellular senescence and aging. However, it has been shown that the number of senescent cells increases in many tissues with age, and senescent cells are found at the site of several age-related pathologies, such as osteoarthritis and osteoporosis. In addition, p16 expression has been shown to increase with age in the mouse brain, bone marrow and pancreas. Senescent cells also exhibit altered patterns of gene expression. Specifically, the cells exhibit up-regulation of genes that encode for extracellular-matrix degrading proteins (such as metalloproteases), inflammatory cytokines, and growth factors. These secretory factors, in addition to others, make up what is known the Senescence-Associated Secretory Phenotype (SASP), and have been shown by Campisi and others to disrupt the function of surrounding cells. The damage that these factors do to the extracellular matrix is a possible mechanism for how the accumulation of senescent cells in tissues results in aging in mammals. A recent study by Campisi and others shows that targeted apoptosis of senescent cells in age-impaired tissues can improve tissue function and homeostasis, supporting her theories on the relationship between senescence and aging.

Other research conducted by Campisi has shown that factors secreted by senescent cells can also stimulate growth and angiogenic activity in nearby cells. Ironically, these secreted factors can facilitate the development of cancer in surrounding premalignant cells. These findings supports the idea that the senescence response is antagonistically pleiotropic, or that the response can be simultaneously beneficial and harmful to an organism's fitness. While the senescence response can be effective at protecting organisms from cancer at young ages, it can also cause the age-related decline in tissue function typical of many degenerative diseases in mammals. If the senescence response allowed an organism to be more likely to reach reproducing age while also being deleterious to the organism later in life, there would be little selective pressure to eliminate the harmful effects of the trait. This important concept may explain the development of aging in mammals from an evolutionary perspective.

One of the goals of Campisi's research is the better balance of the positive effects of cellular senescence, namely the powerful defense against cancer that the response provides, against the deleterious effects of the response, such as aging and the resulting decline in tissue function. Inevitably, this would provide insight into the diagnosis and treatment of several age-related pathologies in humans.

== Death ==
Campisi died after a long illness on January 19, 2024, at the age of 75.

== Awards ==
- Fellow of the American Association for the Advancement of Science
- Longevity Prize from the Ipsen Foundation
- Olav Thon Foundation Prize
- National Academy of Sciences member, 2018
