= Open Medicine Foundation =

American nonprofit organization

- Formation: 2012; 13 years ago
- Headquarters: Agoura Hills, California
- President: Linda Tannenbaum
- Website: www.omf.ngo

The Open Medicine Foundation (OMF) is a US-based charity that funds research into the illnesses myalgic encephalomyelitis/chronic fatigue syndrome (ME/CFS), fibromyalgia, post-treatment Lyme disease syndrome, and long COVID.

== History ==
The OMF was founded in 2012 by Linda Tannenbaum after her daughter became ill with ME/CFS in 2006. Tannenbaum has said, "For a long time, the medical world didn’t feel ME/CFS was a real disease," and advocates for increased federal research funding.

In 2018, the OMF received a donation of $5 million in Bitcoin from the anonymous founder of the Pineapple Fund.

== Activities ==
The OMF provides funding for seven collaborative research centers, including one center at Stanford, one at Harvard, one at the University of Montreal, as well as locations in Australia and Sweden. Research is mainly funded by patients and families.

Research has included investigations into T-cells and immunological genes, analyses of muscle and other tissues, a study on families of patients, an attempt to develop a nanoneedle-based blood test for ME/CFS, studies on the density and deformability of blood cells compared to healthy controls, work on mitochondrial function, and investigation of potential altered metabolism in people with ME/CFS. One project involved a whole-genome mapping of 20 severe ME/CFS patients. Plans to fund multicenter trials of treatments have also been announced.

Along with the Bateman Horne Center, the OMF maintains the Medical Education Resource Center, a website to educate doctors on diagnosis and treatment of complex chronic illnesses. OMF maintains a patient registry (StudyME) to help researcher find participants for their studies.

== Leadership ==
Linda Tannenbaum is CEO and president, while geneticist Ron Davis heads the scientific advisory board.
