= Michael Fossel =

American scientist and physician

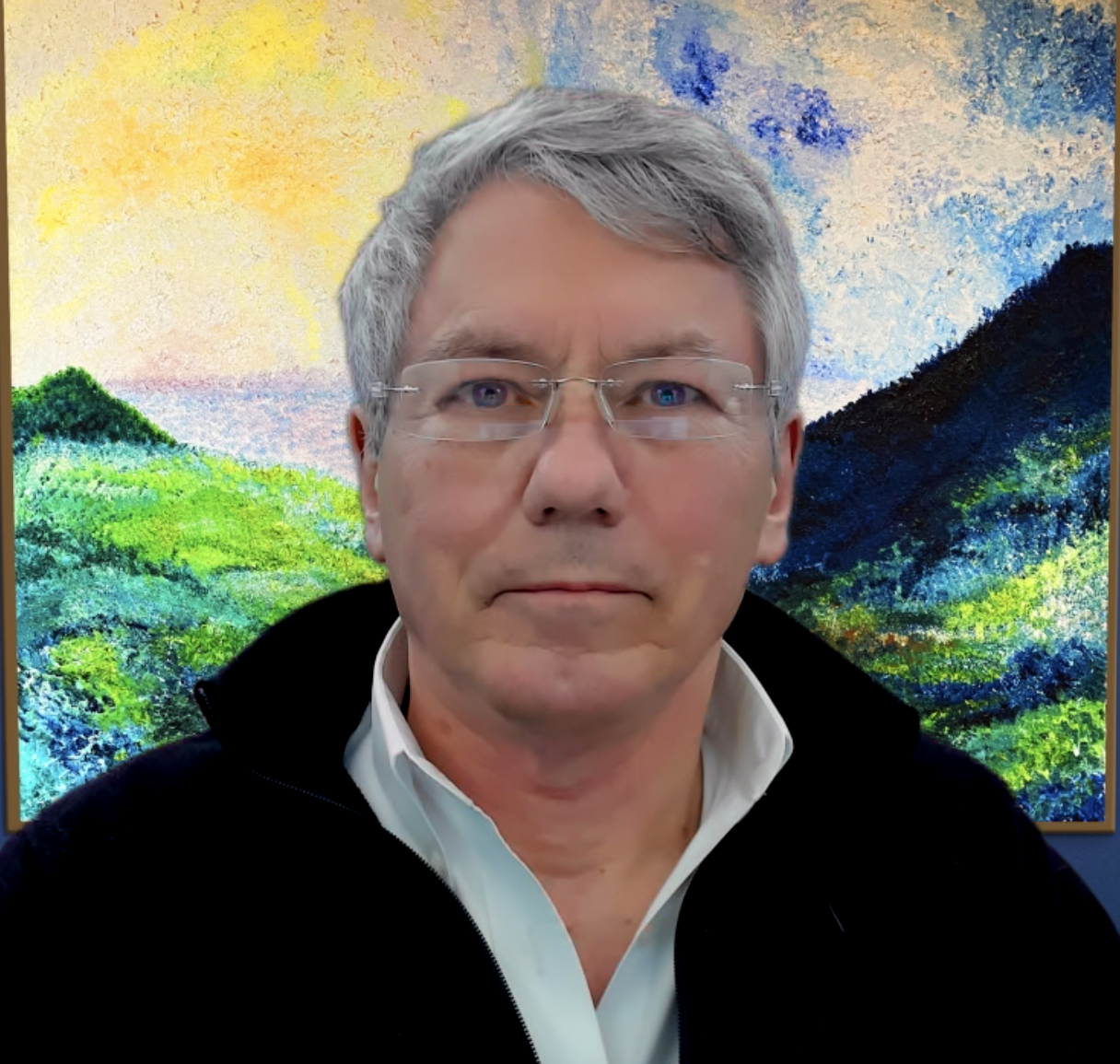
- Born: Michael B. Fossel; 1950 or 1951 (age 75–76); Greenwich, Connecticut, U.S.
- Occupation: Author

Michael B. Fossel (born 1950) is an American biogerontologist. He taught clinical medicine at Michigan State University. Fossel has written four book on aging and was the editor-in-chief of the Journal of Anti-Aging Medicine.

== Early life and education ==
Fossel was born in 1950. He attended Phillips Exeter Academy. He earned a bachelor of arts and a master of arts in psychology from Wesleyan University and a Ph.D. in neurobiology from Stanford University. He also earned an M.D. from Stanford Medical School.

== Career ==
Fossel taught at Stanford University from 1978 to 1981, he was a professor of clinical medicine at Michigan State University from 1985 to 2012, and at Grand Valley State University as well as lecturing at the National Institute for Health, the Smithsonian Institution, and as a guest lecturer at other universities nationally and internationally.

Fossel practiced emergency medicine at St Mary's Hospital in Grand Rapids.

He served on the board of directors, and was for a time the executive director, of the American Aging Association.

He has written a number of books on aging, including Reversing Human Aging (1996). He has also written numerous articles and book chapters on aging, age-related disease and ethics. He was also the editor of the Journal of Anti-Aging Medicine.

His research focus is on premature aging syndromes such as progeria. He is an advocate of telomerase therapy as a potential treatment of age-related diseases, disorders, and syndromes.

== Critical reception ==
- Reversing Human Aging reviewed by Scientific American.
- The Telomerase Revolution reviewed by the Wall Street Journal and The Times (London).

== Works ==
- Reversing Human Aging (1996) Quill.
- Cells, Aging, and Human Disease (2004) Oxford University Press.
- The Telomerase Revolution.
- Reversal. (2026)
