= Bug Adventure =

1994 video game

- Developer(s): Knowledge Adventure
- Publisher(s): Knowledge Adventure
- Platform(s): MS-DOS, Mac OS, Windows
- Release: MS-DOS, Mac OS: WW: January 10, 1994; Windows: WW: 2015
- Genre(s): Educational
- Mode(s): Single-player, multiplayer

Bug Adventure is an educational video game about bugs by Knowledge Adventure. It was released in 1994 for MS-DOS and Macintosh, then for Windows in 2015. The interactive nature almanac and encyclopedia presents facts and media related to bugs (e.g., insects and spiders). It includes a quiz game.
