= Matthew Roszak =

American billionaire venture capitalist

- Born: 1972 or 1973 (age 52–53)
- Education: Lake Forest College
- Occupations: venture capitalist and cryptocurrency investor
- Title: Co-founder and chairman, Bloq

Matthew Roszak (born 1972/1973) is an American billionaire venture capitalist and cryptocurrency investor. Roszak is the co-founder and chairman of Bloq, a blockchain startup company. As of July 2024, his net worth was estimated at US$3.1 billion.

Roszak graduated from Lake Forest College in 1995.

In 2006, while working as a venture capitalist at SilkRoad Equity, he settled U.S. Securities and Exchange Commission (SEC) charges of insider trading in Blue Rhino, a propane tank exchange business.

In January 2021, Roszak had an estimated net worth of US$1.2 billion.

Roszak is married, and lives in Chicago, Illinois.
