= Lifespan Research Institute =

American non-profit organization

- Formation: 2009, SENS Research Foundation 2014, LEAF (Lifespan Extension Advocacy Foundation) aka Lifespan.io 2024, Lifespan Research Institute (formed by a merger between SENS & LEAF)
- Founded: 2009, 2014, 2024
- Founders: Keith Comito, Stephanie Dainow, Lisa Fabiny, Bill Liao
- Type: 501(c)(3)
- Purpose: Longevity Biotechnology - healthy lifespan extension
- Headquarters: Silicon Valley
- Region served: Global
- Method: News outlet, advocacy, intramural research, public education, crowdfunding, investor network, training of next-gen scientists
- Website: www.lifespan.io

The Lifespan Research Institute (LRI) is a non-profit organization whose mission is to prevent, slow-down and reverse age-related diseases by revolutionizing the science of aging and regenerative medicine with cutting-edge research and education.

LRI was formed in October 2024 as the result of a merger between 2 non-profit industry pioneers: LEAF (Lifespan Extension Advocacy Foundation, also known as Lifespan.io) founded in 2014 and based in New York City, and SENS Research Foundation founded in 2009 and based in Silicon Valley, CA. Co-Founders include Bill Liao, Keith Comito, Lisa Fabiny-Kiser and Stephanie Dainow.

The Institute works on the field of longevity biotech research through several programs housed under the new organization:

- LEAF's public advocacy initiatives include a news outlet covering aging research, a scientific conference in NYC, a crowdfunding platform, and the Longevity Investor Network - a robust longevity biotechnology investor network.
- SENS Research Foundation programs include institutional education for scientists, in-house research at their 11,000 sq. ft. research and education center in Mountain View, CA, and partnerships with scientists and international institutions to advance therapies and technologies.

== News outlet ==
LEAF established its news outlet in 2016 with the goal of educating the public on the progress in aging and longevity research. In 2018, LEAF interviewed the Russian geriatrician Valery Novoselov on the questionable case of Jeanne Calment's exceptional longevity. As of 2022, the outlet has published over 1000 news articles, including more than 90 interviews with leading aging and rejuvenation researchers, such as Matt Kaeberlein, Aubrey de Grey, Judith Campisi, Brian Kennedy, Steve Horvath, David Sinclair, and Gregory Fahy.

== Scientific conference ==
Ending Age-Related Diseases: Investment Prospects and Advances in Research (EARD) is an annual scientific conference hosted by LEAF in New York City in the summer. It is focused on biomarkers of aging, fundamental studies on aging, the development of rejuvenation therapies for humans, and investment and regulatory aspects of the longevity industry. In 2023 they hosted their 6th annual and largest conference titled "Longevity + DeSci Summit".

== Crowdfunding platform ==
LEAF's non-profit crowdfunding platform Lifespan.io is dedicated to supporting fundamental and early-stage studies on aging. As of 2022, it helped to collect over $750,000 in support of eight research projects, including three projects by SENS Research Foundation - OncoSENS, MitoSENS and MitoMouse.

== Outreach and advocacy ==
LEAF maintains a variety of outreach activities. Members of the organizations give talks at scientific and public events, appear on television, and give press interviews. In 2017 and 2018, as a part of its outreach activities, LEAF provided scientific advice to help the YouTube channels Kurzgesagt, Life Noggin, and CGP Grey create educational popular science videos about biological aging and the potential of regenerative medicine. In 2023, they launched a public education partnership with Chris Hemsworth's Centr.

== SENS Research Foundation ==
The SENS Research Foundation is a non-profit organization that does research programs and public relations work for the application of regenerative medicine to aging. It was founded in 2009, located in Mountain View, California, US. The organization publishes its reports annually.

In October 2024, SENS Research Foundation and Lifespan.io (Lifespan Extension Advocacy Foundation) announced completion of a merger into the Lifespan Research Institute.

=== Research ===
==== Research programs ====
The SENS Research Foundation (SRF) pursues research projects that correspond to the seven categories of cellular damage due to aging:

Aging damage	Research program	Description and related spin-off companies
Cell loss and cell atrophy	RepleniSENS	Stem cells and tissue engineering; SRF helps fund the Hebert lab at Albert Einstein College of Medicine seeking to replenish and regenerate the neocortex.
Division-obsessed cells	OncoSENS	OncoSENS's solution is to preemptively remove the genes for the telomere-lengthening machinery.; OncoSenX's (spinout from Oisin Biotechnologies, which is a SENS seed-funded startup) suicide gene therapy results in 75–90% reduction in tumor in mice.
Death-resistant cells	ApoptoSENS	Oisin Biotechnologies (SENS seed-funded startup) has a precise targeting technology, which is based on senescent cells' DNA expression.
Mitochondrial mutations	MitoSENS	Allotopic expression of 13 proteins; Initial proof of concept using ATP8 and ATP6 genes was successful. Research was published in the peer-reviewed Nucleic Acids Research journal.; The mitochondrial transplantation project aims to take advantage of the body's natural process of mitochondrial exchange for healthy mitochondrial transfusion.
Intracellular waste products	LysoSENS	Ichor Therapeutics is developing repair therapy for macular degeneration.; Underdog Pharmaceuticals received an Innovation Passport, an accelerated regulatory pathway from the UK government for promising therapies, for a small molecule drug to treat atherosclerosis by clearing arterial plaques. Underdog and SRF received a grant from the National Institutes of Health to pursue this research further.
Extracellular waste products	AmyloSENS	The Degradation of Tau Aggregates project seeks to remove aggregated tau proteins, which are part of age-related cognitive decline, Alzheimer's, and other tauopathies.
Extracellular matrix stiffening	GlycoSENS	Revel Pharmaceuticals is developing therapeutics that can cleave advanced glycation end-product crosslinks.

==== Research collaboration ====
In addition to research undertaken in-house at the Research Center in Mountain View, SRF has also taken part in and/or selectively funded extramural research at various other institutions, including Yale University, Harvard University, Cambridge University, University of Texas, Rice University, and University of Arizona.

==== Research advisory board ====
The SENS Research Foundation's research advisory board includes Pedro J. J. Alvarez, Anthony Atala, George Church, Judith Campisi, William A. Haseltine, Brian K. Kennedy, Jeanne Loring, María Blasco Marhuenda, Bruce Rittmann, Nadia Rosenthal, Rudolph E. Tanzi, Jan Vijg, Michael D. West, and Vladimir Skulachev.

=== Funding source ===
View source data.
View source data.
SRF funding in 2021

Owing to the close relationship between SENS Foundation and Methuselah Foundation and their common activities, during reading articles and public reports there are sometimes misunderstanding about their budgets, directions and amounts of donations which can be distributed between these organizations for various purposes.

On December 9, 2010, Jason Hope, an entrepreneur based in Scottsdale, Arizona, pledged a $500,000 donation.

In 2011, Aubrey de Grey inherited $16.5 million on the death of his mother. Of this he assigned $13 million to fund SENS research, which by 2013 had the effect of roughly doubling the SRF yearly budget to $4 million.

According SRF annual reports,

- in 2017 its income was $7,871,530 and expenses $3,915,682 ($2,146,412 on research, $920,533 on education, $172,380 on outreach, $676,534 on administration).
- in 2018 – unclear, the annual report does not contain this information.
- in 2019 its income was $2,683,611 and expenses $4,361,258 ($2,331,364 on research, $859,222 on education, $642,056 on outreach, $582,616 on administration).

The Pineapple Fund donated $2 million to SENS in 2017–18, that's in addition to $1 million donated to Methuselah Foundation.

Ethereum co-founder Vitalik Buterin donated $2.4 million in 2018. Then in 2020 Vitalik Buterin together with Sam Bankman-Fried and Haseeb Qureshi donated a total of $150,000 to SENS Research Foundation to combat aging and aging-related diseases at the choice of users of Twitter as a result of open voting.

In 2020, Oculus cofounder Michael Antonov donated $1 million, of which $600,000 was a matching donation.

=== Goals ===
According to the organization site, its goal is to "help build the industry that will cure the diseases of aging". It funds research and uses outreach and education in order to expedite the various regenerative medicine research programs that go together to make the SENS project. The foundation also conducts its own student program SRF Education.

=== History ===
Before the foundation was founded in March 2009, the SENS research program was mainly pursued by the Methuselah Foundation, co-founded by Aubrey de Grey and David Gobel.

When the SENS rejuvenation approach was announced in the 2000s, while some biogerontologists supported the SENS program, many contended that the ultimate goals of de Grey's programme were too speculative given the state of technology and referred to it as "fantasy rather than science". By the mid-2010s, the rejuvenation approach gained traction with multiple startup companies created from SENS research findings. In 2021, entrepreneur Michael Greve pledged another €300 million for rejuvenation biotechnology startup companies. That same year, Underdog Pharmaceuticals, a startup company spun out from a research program at SENS Research Foundation, was awarded an Innovation Passport from the United Kingdom Medicines and Healthcare products Regulatory Agency, which intends to streamline the approval program of promising therapies. In August 2021, Aubrey de Grey was suspended from the foundation. The CEO of the SENS Research Foundation, Jim O’Neill left in the preceding July, at the same time de Grey was suspended.

== See also ==
- Ending Aging
- Buck Institute for Research on Aging
- Life Extension Advocacy Foundation
- Methuselah Foundation
