= Vladimir Dilman =

Russian scientist and physician

Vladimir Mikhailovich Dilman (19 July 1925 – 21 May 1994) was a Soviet scientist and physician. He served on the staff of the N.N. Petrov Research Institute of Oncology for many years. He contributed to the development of oncology, endocrinology and gerontology.

In 1954 Vladimir Dilman proposed hypothesis of aging that at first become known only in the USSR, as the elevation hypothesis. In 1968 it took the form and became known as the neuroendocrine theory of aging.
