= Carina Kern =

British geneticist

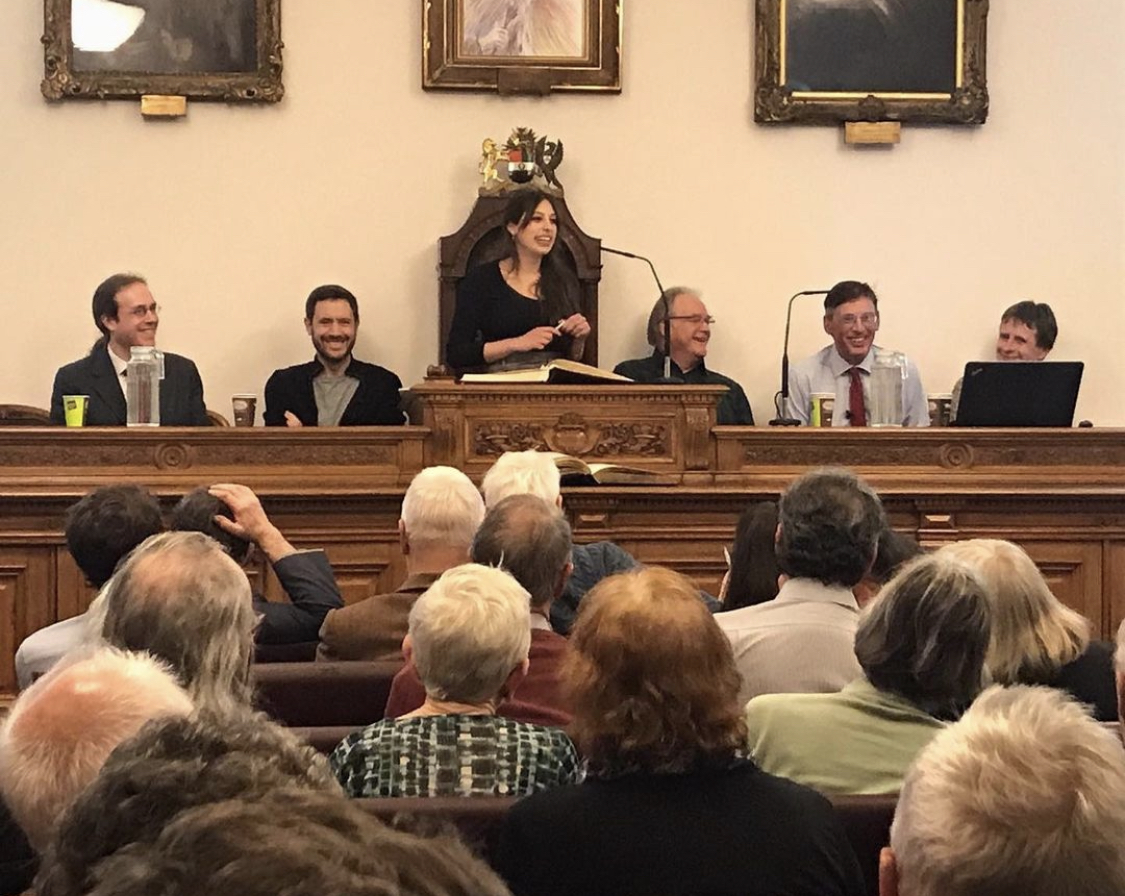
Dr Kern at Linnean Society

Carina Kern is a geneticist and biotechnology executive known for her work on the biology of aging, the molecular mechanisms of chronic disease and space biology. She is founder and CEO of LinkGevity Limited, a biotechnology company based at the Babraham Research Campus, affiliated with the University of Cambridge. Her work focuses on the development of therapeutics targeting degenerative processes, using artificial intelligence to guide drug discovery and molecular modeling. Kern was previously at the Department of Genetics, Evolution and Environment in the University College London.

She has held academic and leadership roles in interdisciplinary networks, including serving as President of the London Evolutionary Research Network and Co-Chair of the CleanTech Business Challenge, an initiative co led by University College London and the London Business School.

== Early research ==
Her early work on C. elegans has been regarded to challenge several decades of orthodoxy on the notion of how single gene switch-off mechanisms could extend lifespan. This research received significant media coverage and helped reshape discussion in the aging field. The work was cited in several main stream media outlets in the UK including Sky News, Evening Standard The Times and The Independent

Kern's research has contributed to a re-evaluation of how biological aging is conceptualized. She has been an outspoken critic of ideas that she argues are inadequate to guide research towards an understanding of the aging process. These include the concept of cellular senescence, which she argues has been outgrown by recent research progress.

She has also studied the interface between metabolism and immunity, co-authoring work on mitochondrial reprogramming and innate immune training, showing that resistance to infection can be modulated through metabolic cues across species, from C. elegans to humans.

== Recent research ==
In recent years, Kern has proposed the Blueprint Theory of Aging, which integrates insights from genetics, molecular biology, and evolutionary theory to explain how aging-related diseases arise from conserved biological constraints.

A major focus of her current work is necrosis, a form of unregulated cell death implicated in tissue degeneration, chronic disease, and aging. Kern led the development of a novel therapeutic compound, referred to as Anti-Necrotic™, which targets the early stages of necrosis and aims to preserve cellular integrity.

Anti-Necrotic™ has also been selected by NASA’s Translational Research Institute for Space Health (TRISH) as one of twelve global innovations for study in spaceflight contexts, reflecting its potential to counteract accelerated aging in astronauts exposed to microgravity and cosmic radiation.

In a recent paper, Kern has shown how necrosis could be key to slowing the ageing process in humans as well as being a potential high value therapeutic target across multi-factorial diseases such as cancer and kidney disease.
