= Anita Goel =

American Physicist-Physician & Nanobiophysics Innovator

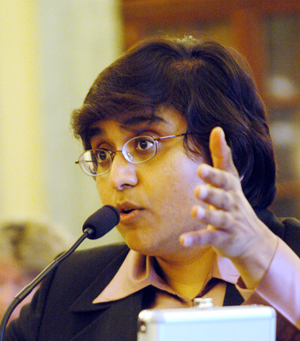
- Born: Worcester, Massachusetts, United States
- Citizenship: US
- Education: Harvard University; MIT; Stanford University; Harvard Medical School
- Known for: Molecular motors Nanobiophysics; Nanotechnology; Physics of Life; Living Systems; Quantum Information; Foundations of Quantum Mechanics, Information, and Consciousness
- Awards: 1st XPRIZE for Healthcare- Grand Prize Winner] MIT TR35: World's Top 35 Science and Technology Innovators; Scientific American's World's Most Influential Visionaries in Biotech; One of the Most Influential Nanotechnology Leaders
- Scientific career
- Fields: Physicist; Physician; Physician-Scientist; Nanobiophysicist
- Workplaces: Harvard University
- Doctoral advisor: Dudley Robert Herschbach

Anita Goel is an American physicist, physician, and scientist in the emerging field of Nanobiophysics. At the Nanobiosym Research Institute (NBS), Goel examines the physics of life and the way nanomotors read and write information into DNA.

== Education ==
Goel received a PhD and M.A. in physics from Harvard University, where she worked with Nobel laureate Dudley R. Herschbach. Her thesis was entitled Single Molecule Dynamics of Motor Enzymes Along DNA.

She received a BS in physics with honors and distinction from Stanford University, where her honors thesis mentor was Nobel laureate Steven Chu.

She also earned in parallel an M.D. from the Harvard–MIT Joint Division of Health Sciences and Technology (HST).

== Career ==
Goel has over 80 patents worldwide and has published in journals including Nature Nanotechnology and Scientific American and the "Proceedings of the National Academy of Sciences (PNAS)."

She has testified in the US Senate for the $1.5 Billion dollar National Nanotechnology Initiative; advised President Obama's PCAST for his Strategy for American Innovation; served on the Triennial Review Board of the National Academy of Sciences.

She was invited by the late MIT President Chuck Vest to serve on the Committee on Manufacturing Innovation of the National Academy of Engineering; and on the Canadian Institute for Advanced Research (CIFAR). She served on the Nanotechnology & Scientific Advisory Boards of Lockheed Martin and PepsiCo Corporations.

As the chairman and CEO of Nanobiosym Diagnostics (NBSDx), Goel oversees product design, engineering, clinical trials, regulatory approvals and manufacturing of the company's breakthrough technologies, such as the Gene-RADAR and its “apps” for personalized precision medicine, digital health and global health security. In 2020, Barclay's Bank and the Unreasonable Group selected Nanobiosym Dx amongst the “World’s Top 10 Companies solving the Global COVID Crisis” and Scientific American featured her work on how mobile precision testing for COVID could safely re-open the US and global economy.

== Awards ==
Named as one of the World's "Top 35 science and technology innovators" by MIT Technology Review and one of the "World's Most Influential Visionaries in Biotech" by Scientific American Goel has been recognized with three DARPA Breakthrough Awards, two USAID Grand Challenge Awards, NASA's Galactic Challenge Award, and multiple awards from DOD, DOE, AFOSR, and NSF.
