= Life extension =

Concept of extending human lifespan

Life extension is the concept of extending the human lifespan, either through incremental improvements in medicine or through radical increases in maximum lifespan beyond its generally-settled biological limit of around 125 years. This field of study has been explored by numerous researchers and advocates, including "life extensionists", "immortalists", and "longevists" (those who aspire to achieve prolonged lifespans themselves). These researchers and advocates hypothesize that future advancements in tissue rejuvenation, stem cells, regenerative medicine, molecular repair, gene therapy, pharmaceuticals, and organ replacement (such as through artificial organs or xenotransplantations) will eventually enable humans to have indefinite lifespans through complete rejuvenation to a state of optimal health and youth (agerasia). The ethical implications of life extension are a subject of discourse among bioethicists.

The sale of purported anti-aging products, such as supplements and hormone replacement therapy, is a lucrative global industry. For example, the industry that promotes the use of hormones as a treatment for consumers to slow or reverse the aging process in the US market generated about $50 billion of revenue a year in 2009. The use of such hormone products has not been proven to be effective or safe. Similarly, a variety of apps make claims to assist in extending the life of their users, or predicting their lifespans.

== Average life expectancy and lifespan ==
During the process of aging, an organism accumulates damage to its macromolecules, cells, tissues, and organs. Specifically, aging is characterized as and thought to be caused by "genomic instability, telomere attrition, epigenetic alterations, loss of proteostasis, deregulated nutrient sensing, mitochondrial dysfunction, cellular senescence, stem cell exhaustion, and altered intercellular communication." Oxidation damage to cellular contents caused by free radicals is believed to contribute to aging as well.

The longest documented human lifespan is 122 years 164 days, the case of Jeanne Calment, who according to records was born in 1875 and died in 1997, whereas the maximum lifespan of a wildtype mouse, commonly used as a model in research on aging, is about three years. Genetic differences between humans and mice that may account for these different aging rates include differences in efficiency of DNA repair, antioxidant defenses, energy metabolism, proteostasis maintenance, and recycling mechanisms such as autophagy.

The average life expectancy in a population is lowered by infant and child mortality, which are frequently linked to infectious diseases or nutrition problems. Later in life, vulnerability to accidents and age-related chronic disease such as cancer or cardiovascular disease play an increasing role in mortality. Extension of life expectancy and lifespan can often be achieved by access to improved medical care, vaccinations, good diet, exercise, and avoidance of hazards such as smoking.

Maximum lifespan is determined by the rate of aging for a species inherent in its genes and by environmental factors. Widely recognized methods of extending maximum lifespan in model organisms such as nematodes, fruit flies, and mice include caloric restriction, gene manipulation, and administration of pharmaceuticals. Another technique uses evolutionary pressures such as breeding from only older members or altering levels of extrinsic mortality. Some animals such as hydra, planarian flatworms, and certain sponges, corals, and jellyfish do not die of old age and exhibit potential immortality.

== History ==
The extension of life has been a desire of humanity and a mainstay motif in the history of scientific pursuits and ideas throughout history, from the Sumerian Epic of Gilgamesh and the Egyptian Smith medical papyrus, all the way through the Taoists, Ayurveda practitioners, alchemists, hygienists such as Luigi Cornaro, Johann Cohausen and Christoph Wilhelm Hufeland, and philosophers such as Francis Bacon, René Descartes, Benjamin Franklin and Nicolas Condorcet. However, the beginning of the modern period in this endeavor can be traced to the end of the 19th – beginning of the 20th century, to the so-called "fin-de-siècle" (end of the century) period, denoted as an "end of an epoch" and characterized by the rise of scientific optimism and therapeutic activism, entailing the pursuit of life extension (or life-extensionism). Among the foremost researchers of life extension at this period were the Nobel Prize winning biologist Elie Metchnikoff (1845-1916) -- the author of the cell theory of immunity and vice director of Institut Pasteur in Paris, and Charles-Édouard Brown-Séquard (1817-1894) -- the president of the French Biological Society and one of the founders of modern endocrinology.

Sociologist James Hughes claims that science has been tied to a cultural narrative of conquering death since the Age of Enlightenment. He cites Francis Bacon (1561–1626) as an advocate of using science and reason to extend human life, noting Bacon's novel New Atlantis, wherein scientists worked toward delaying aging and prolonging life. Robert Boyle (1627–1691), founding member of the Royal Society, also hoped that science would make substantial progress with life extension, according to Hughes, and proposed such experiments as "to replace the blood of the old with the blood of the young". Biologist Alexis Carrel (1873–1944) was inspired by a belief in indefinite human lifespan that he developed after experimenting with cells, says Hughes.

=== Contemporary ===
Regulatory and legal struggles between the Food and Drug Administration (FDA) and the Life Extension organization included seizure of merchandise and court action. In 1991, Saul Kent and Bill Faloon, the principals of the organization, were jailed for four hours and were released on $850,000 bond each. After 11 years of legal battles, Kent and Faloon convinced the US Attorney's Office to dismiss all criminal indictments brought against them by the FDA.

In 2003, Doubleday published "The Immortal Cell: One Scientist's Quest to Solve the Mystery of Human Aging," by Michael D. West. West emphasised the potential role of embryonic stem cells in life extension.

Other modern life extensionists include writer Gennady Stolyarov, who insists that death is "the enemy of us all, to be fought with medicine, science, and technology"; transhumanist philosopher Zoltan Istvan, who proposes that the "transhumanist must safeguard one's own existence above all else"; futurist George Dvorsky, who considers aging to be a problem that desperately needs to be solved; and recording artist Steve Aoki, who has been called "one of the most prolific campaigners for life extension".

==== Scientific research ====
In 1991, the American Academy of Anti-Aging Medicine (A4M) was formed. The American Board of Medical Specialties recognizes neither anti-aging medicine nor the A4M's professional standing.

In 2003, Aubrey de Grey and David Gobel formed the Methuselah Foundation, which gives financial grants to anti-aging research projects. In 2009, de Grey and several others founded the SENS Research Foundation, a California-based scientific research organization which conducts research into aging and funds other anti-aging research projects at various universities. In 2013, Google announced Calico, a new company based in San Francisco that will harness new technologies to increase scientific understanding of the biology of aging. It is led by Arthur D. Levinson, and its research team includes scientists such as Hal V. Barron, David Botstein, and Cynthia Kenyon. In 2014, biologist Craig Venter founded Human Longevity Inc., a company dedicated to scientific research to end aging through genomics and cell therapy. They received funding with the goal of compiling a comprehensive human genotype, microbiome, and phenotype database.

Aside from private initiatives, aging research is being conducted in university laboratories, and includes universities such as Harvard and UCLA. University researchers have made a number of breakthroughs in extending the lives of mice and insects by reversing certain aspects of aging.

== Research ==
Theoretically, extension of maximum lifespan in humans could be achieved by reducing the rate of aging damage by periodic replacement of damaged tissues, molecular repair or rejuvenation of deteriorated cells and tissues, reversal of harmful epigenetic changes, or the enhancement of enzyme telomerase activity.

Research geared towards life extension strategies in various organisms is currently under way at a number of academic and private institutions. Since 2009, investigators have found ways to increase the lifespan of nematode worms and yeast by 10-fold; the record in nematodes was achieved through genetic engineering and the extension in yeast by a combination of genetic engineering and caloric restriction. A 2009 review of longevity research noted: "Extrapolation from worms to mammals is risky at best, and it cannot be assumed that interventions will result in comparable life extension factors. Longevity gains from dietary restriction, or from mutations studied previously, yield smaller benefits to Drosophila than to nematodes, and smaller still to mammals. This is not unexpected, since mammals have evolved to live many times the worm's lifespan, and humans live nearly twice as long as the next longest-lived primate. From an evolutionary perspective, mammals and their ancestors have already undergone several hundred million years of natural selection favoring traits that could directly or indirectly favor increased longevity, and may thus have already settled on gene sequences that promote lifespan. Moreover, the very notion of a "life-extension factor" that could apply across taxa presumes a linear response rarely seen in biology."

=== Anti-aging/life-extension drugs ===
There are numerous chemicals intended to slow the aging process under study in animal models. One type of research is related to the observed effects of a calorie restriction (CR) diet, which has been shown to extend lifespan in some animals. Based on that research, there have been attempts to develop drugs that will have the same effect on the aging process as a CR diet, which are known as caloric restriction mimetic drugs, such as rapamycin and metformin.

Sirtuin activating polyphenols, such as resveratrol and pterostilbene, and flavonoids, such as quercetin and fisetin, as well as oleic acid are dietary supplements that have also been studied in this context. Other common supplements with less clear biological pathways to target aging include lipoic acid, senolytics, and coenzyme Q10.

While agents such as these have some limited laboratory evidence of efficacy in animals, there are no studies to date in humans for drugs that may promote life extension, mainly because research investment remains at a low level, and regulatory standards are high. Aging is not recognized as a preventable condition by governments, indicating there is no clear pathway to approval of anti-aging medications. Further, anti-aging drug candidates are under constant review by regulatory authorities like the US Food and Drug Administration, which stated in 2023 that "no medication has been proven to slow or reverse the aging process."

LDL-C lowering drugs such as statins and PCSK9 inhibitors present with may help to increase human lifespans by reducing the risk of atherosclerotic cardiovascular disease.

=== Nanotechnology ===
Future advances in nanomedicine could give rise to life extension through the repair of many processes thought to be responsible for aging. K. Eric Drexler, one of the founders of nanotechnology, postulated cell repair machines, including ones operating within cells and utilizing as yet hypothetical molecular computers, in his 1986 book Engines of Creation. Raymond Kurzweil, a futurist and transhumanist, stated in his book The Singularity Is Near that he believes that advanced medical nanorobotics could completely remedy the effects of aging by 2030. According to Richard Feynman, it was his former graduate student and collaborator Albert Hibbs who originally suggested to him (circa 1959) the idea of a medical use for Feynman's theoretical nanomachines (see biological machine). Hibbs suggested that certain repair machines might one day be reduced in size to the point that it would, in theory, be possible to (as Feynman put it) "swallow the doctor". The idea was incorporated into Feynman's 1959 essay There's Plenty of Room at the Bottom.

=== Cyborgs ===
The replacement of biological organs, which are susceptible to diseases, with mechanical ones has the potential to extend life. This is the goal of the 2045 Initiative.

=== Cryonics ===
Cryonics is the low-temperature freezing (usually at −196 °C or −320.8 °F or 77.1 K) of a human corpse, with the hope that resuscitation may be possible in the future. It is regarded with skepticism within the mainstream scientific community and has been characterized as quackery.

=== Strategies for engineered negligible senescence ===
Another proposed life extension technology aims to combine existing and predicted future biochemical and genetic techniques. SENS proposes that rejuvenation may be obtained by removing aging damage via the use of stem cells and tissue engineering, telomere-lengthening machinery, allotopic expression of mitochondrial proteins, targeted ablation of cells, immunotherapeutic clearance, and novel lysosomal hydrolases.

While some biogerontologists find these ideas "worthy of discussion", others contend that the alleged benefits are too speculative given the current state of technology, referring to it as "fantasy rather than science".

== Genetic editing ==
Genome editing, in which nucleic acid polymers are delivered as a drug and are either expressed as proteins, interfere with the expression of proteins, or correct genetic mutations, has been proposed as a future strategy to prevent aging.

=== CRISPR/Cas9 ===
CRISPR/Cas9 edits genes by precisely cutting DNA and then harnessing natural DNA repair processes to modify the gene in the desired manner. The system has two components: the Cas9 enzyme and a guide RNA. A large array of genetic modifications have been found to increase lifespan in model organisms such as yeast, nematode worms, fruit flies, and mice. As of 2013, the longest extension of life caused by a single gene manipulation was roughly 50% in mice and 10-fold in nematode worms.

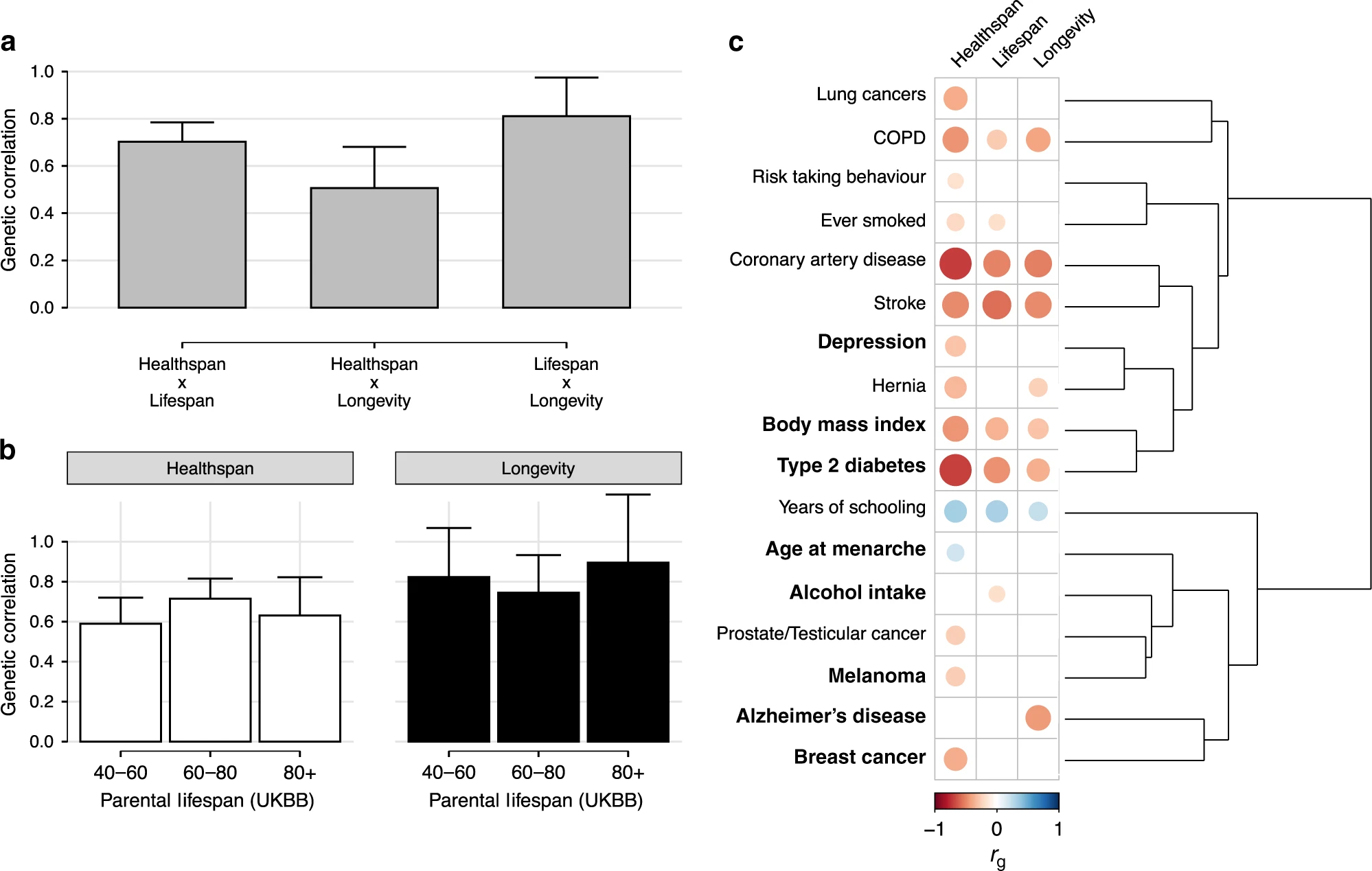
"Healthspan, parental lifespan, and longevity are highly genetically correlated."

In July 2020 scientists, using public biological data on 1.75 m people with known lifespans overall, identify 10 genomic loci which appear to intrinsically influence healthspan, lifespan, and longevity – of which half have not been reported previously at genome-wide significance and most being associated with cardiovascular disease – and identify haem metabolism as a promising candidate for further research within the field. Their study suggests that high levels of iron in the blood likely reduce, and genes involved in metabolising iron likely increase healthy years of life in humans. The same month other scientists report that yeast cells of the same genetic material and within the same environment age in two distinct ways, describe a biomolecular mechanism that can determine which process dominates during aging and genetically engineer a novel aging route with substantially extended lifespan.

=== Fooling genes ===
In The Selfish Gene, Richard Dawkins describes an approach to life-extension that involves "fooling genes" into thinking the body is young. Dawkins attributes inspiration for this idea to Peter Medawar. The basic idea is that our bodies are composed of genes that activate throughout our lifetimes, some when we are young and others when we are older. Presumably, these genes are activated by environmental factors, and the changes caused by these genes activating can be lethal. It is a statistical certainty that we possess more lethal genes that activate in later life than in early life. Therefore, to extend life, we should be able to prevent these genes from switching on, and we should be able to do so by "identifying changes in the internal chemical environment of a body that take place during aging... and by simulating the superficial chemical properties of a young body".

=== Cloning and body part replacement ===
Some life extensionists suggest that therapeutic cloning and stem cell research could one day provide a way to generate cells, body parts, or even entire bodies (generally referred to as reproductive cloning) that would be genetically identical to a prospective patient. In 2008, the US Department of Defense announced a program to research the possibility of growing human body parts on mice. Complex biological structures, such as mammalian joints and limbs, have not yet been replicated. Dog and primate brain transplantation experiments were conducted in the mid-20th century but failed due to rejection and the inability to restore nerve connections. As of 2006, the implantation of bio-engineered bladders grown from patients' own cells has proven to be a viable treatment for bladder disease. Proponents of body part replacement and cloning contend that the required biotechnologies are likely to appear earlier than other life-extension technologies.

The use of human stem cells, particularly embryonic stem cells, is controversial. Opponents' objections generally are based on interpretations of religious teachings or ethical considerations. Proponents of stem cell research point out that cells are routinely formed and destroyed in a variety of contexts. Use of stem cells taken from the umbilical cord or parts of the adult body may not provoke controversy.

The controversies over cloning are similar, except general public opinion in most countries stands in opposition to reproductive cloning. Some proponents of therapeutic cloning predict the production of whole bodies, lacking consciousness, for eventual brain transplantation.

== Ethics and politics ==
=== Scientific controversy ===
Some critics dispute the portrayal of aging as a disease. For example, Leonard Hayflick, who determined that fibroblasts are limited to around 50 cell divisions, reasoned that aging is an unavoidable consequence of entropy. Hayflick and fellow biogerontologists Jay Olshansky and Bruce Carnes have strongly criticized the anti-aging industry in response to what they see as unscrupulous profiteering from the sale of unproven anti-aging supplements.

=== Consumer motivations ===
Research by Sobh and Martin (2011) suggests that people buy anti-aging products to obtain a hoped-for self (e.g., keeping a youthful skin) or to avoid a feared-self (e.g., looking old). The research shows that when consumers pursue a hoped-for self, it is expectations of success that most strongly drive their motivation to use the product. The research also shows why doing badly when trying to avoid a feared self is more motivating than doing well. When product use is seen to fail it is more motivating than success when consumers seek to avoid a feared-self.

=== Political parties ===
Though many scientists state that life extension and radical life extension are possible, there are still no international or national programs focused on radical life extension.

=== Political leaders ===
General Secretary of the Chinese Communist Party Xi Jinping and President of Russia Vladimir Putin discussed organ transplants and "immortality" during the 2025 China Victory Day Parade. This conversation is caught recorded by China Central Television's public broadcast. During the conversation, Putin spoke about biotechnology and "human organs will continue to be transplanted, and people will became younger and younger". Xi responded Putin, talking about how people predicted that life expectancy can reach up to 150 years and how 70 years old still is quite young compared to the past. At the press conference during the evening, Putin clarified to Russian media that he and Xi did discuss about the topic of human lifespan.

=== Silicon Valley ===
Some tech innovators and Silicon Valley entrepreneurs have invested heavily into anti-aging research. This includes Jeff Bezos (founder of Amazon), Larry Ellison (founder of Oracle), Peter Thiel (former PayPal CEO), Larry Page (co-founder of Google), Peter Diamandis, Sam Altman (CEO of OpenAI, invested in Retro Biosciences), Brian Armstrong (founder of Coinbase and NewLimit), and Bryan Johnson (Founder of Kernel).

=== Commentators ===
Leon Kass (chairman of the US President's Council on Bioethics from 2001 to 2005) has questioned whether potential exacerbation of overpopulation problems would make life extension unethical. He states his opposition to life extension with the words:

"simply to covet a prolonged life span for ourselves is both a sign and a cause of our failure to open ourselves to procreation and to any higher purpose ... [The] desire to prolong youthfulness is not only a childish desire to eat one's life and keep it; it is also an expression of a childish and narcissistic wish incompatible with devotion to posterity."

John Harris, former editor-in-chief of the Journal of Medical Ethics, argues that as long as life is worth living, according to the person himself, we have a powerful moral imperative to save the life and thus to develop and offer life extension therapies to those who want them.

Transhumanist philosopher Nick Bostrom has argued that any technological advances in life extension must be equitably distributed and not restricted to a privileged few. In an extended metaphor entitled "The Fable of the Dragon-Tyrant", Bostrom envisions death as a monstrous dragon who demands human sacrifices. In the fable, after a lengthy debate between those who believe the dragon is a fact of life and those who believe the dragon can and should be destroyed, the dragon is finally killed. Bostrom argues that political inaction allowed many preventable human deaths to occur.

=== Overpopulation concerns ===
Controversy about life extension is due to fear of overpopulation and possible effects on society. Biogerontologist Aubrey De Grey counters the overpopulation critique by pointing out that the therapy could postpone or eliminate menopause, allowing women to space out their pregnancies over more years and thus decreasing the yearly population growth rate. Moreover, the philosopher and futurist Max More argues that, given that the worldwide population growth rate is slowing down and is projected to eventually stabilize and begin falling, superlongevity would be unlikely to contribute to overpopulation.

=== Opinion polls ===
A Spring 2013 Pew Research poll in the United States found that 38% of Americans would want life extension treatments, and 56% would reject it. However, it also found that 68% believed most people would want it and that only 4% consider an "ideal lifespan" to be more than 120 years. The median "ideal lifespan" was 91 years of age and the majority of the public (63%) viewed medical advances aimed at prolonging life as generally good. 41% of Americans believed that radical life extension (RLE) would be good for society, while 51% said they believed it would be bad for society. One possibility for why 56% of Americans claim they would reject life extension treatments may be due to the cultural perception that living longer would result in a longer period of decrepitude, and that the elderly in our current society are unhealthy.

Religious people are no more likely to oppose life extension than the unaffiliated, though some variation exists between religious denominations.

=== Aging as a disease ===
Most mainstream medical organizations and practitioners do not consider aging to be a disease. Biologist David Sinclair says: "I don't see aging as a disease, but as a collection of quite predictable diseases caused by the deterioration of the body." The two main arguments used are that aging is both inevitable and universal while diseases are not. However, not everyone agrees. Harry R. Moody, director of academic affairs for AARP, notes that what is normal and what is disease strongly depend on a historical context. David Gems, assistant director of the Institute of Healthy Ageing, argues that aging should be viewed as a disease. In response to the universality of aging, David Gems notes that it is as misleading as arguing that Basenji are not dogs because they do not bark. Because of the universality of aging he calls it a "special sort of disease". Robert M. Perlman, coined the terms "aging syndrome" and "disease complex" in 1954 to describe aging.

The discussion whether aging should be viewed as a disease or not has important implications. One view is, this would stimulate pharmaceutical companies to develop life extension therapies and in the United States of America, it would also increase the regulation of the anti-aging market by the Food and Drug Administration (FDA). Anti-aging now falls under the regulations for cosmetic medicine which are less tight than those for drugs.

== Beliefs and methods ==
=== Senolytics and prolongevity drugs ===
A senolytic (from the words senescence and -lytic, "decomposition or breakdown") is among a class of small molecules under basic research to determine if they can selectively induce death of senescent cells and improve health in humans. A goal of this research is to discover or develop agents to delay, prevent, alleviate, or reverse age-related diseases. Removal of senescent cells with senolytics has been proposed as a method of enhancing immunity during aging.

A related concept is "senostatic", which means to suppress senescence.

Senolytics eliminate senescent cells whereas senomorphics – with candidates such as Apigenin, Everolimus and Rapamycin – modulate properties of senescent cells without eliminating them, suppressing phenotypes of senescence, including the SASP. Senomorphic effects may be one major effect mechanism of a range of prolongevity drug candidates. Such candidates are however typically not studied for just one mechanism, but multiple. There are biological databases of prolongevity drug candidates under research as well as of potential gene/protein targets. These are enhanced by longitudinal cohort studies, electronic health records, computational (drug) screening methods, computational biomarker-discovery methods and computational biodata-interpretation/personalized medicine methods.

Besides rapamycin and senolytics, the drug-repurposing candidates studied most extensively include metformin, acarbose, spermidine and NAD+ enhancers.

Many prolongevity drugs are synthetic alternatives or potential complements to existing nutraceuticals, such as various sirtuin-activating compounds under investigation like SRT2104. In some cases pharmaceutical administration is combined with that of neutraceuticals – such as in the case of glycine combined with NAC. Often studies are structured based on or thematize specific prolongevity targets, listing both nutraceuticals and pharmaceuticals (together or separately) such as FOXO3-activators.

Researchers are also exploring ways to mitigate side-effects from such substances (possibly most notably rapamycin and its derivatives) such as via protocols of intermittent administration and have called for research that helps determine optimal treatment schedules (including timing) in general.

=== Diets and supplements ===
==== Vitamins and antioxidants ====
The free-radical theory of aging suggests that antioxidant supplements might extend human life. Reviews, however, have found that use of vitamin A (as β-carotene) and vitamin E supplements possibly can increase mortality. Other reviews have found no relationship between vitamin E and other vitamins with mortality. Vitamin D supplementation of various dosages is investigated in trials and there also is research into GlyNAC.

==== Complications ====
Complications of antioxidant supplementation (especially continuous high dosages far above the RDA) include that reactive oxygen species (ROS), which are mitigated by antioxidants, "have been found to be physiologically vital for signal transduction, gene regulation, and redox regulation, among others, implying that their complete elimination would be harmful". In particular, one way of multiple they can be detrimental is by inhibiting adaptation to exercise such as muscle hypertrophy (e.g. during dedicated periods of caloric surplus). There is also research into stimulating/activating/fueling endogenous antioxidant generation, in particular e.g. of neutraceutical glycine and pharmaceutical NAC. Antioxidants can change the oxidation status of different e.g. tissues, targets or sites each with potentially different implications, especially for different concentrations. A review suggests mitochondria have a hormetic response to ROS, whereby low oxidative damage can be beneficial.

==== Dietary restriction ====
As of 2021, there is no clinical evidence that any dietary restriction practice contributes to human longevity.

==== Healthy diet ====
Research suggests that increasing adherence to Mediterranean diet patterns is associated with a reduction in total and cause-specific mortality, extending health- and lifespan. Research is identifying the key beneficial components of the Mediterranean diet. Studies suggest dietary changes are a factor of national relative rises in life-span.

==== Optimal diet ====
Approaches to develop optimal diets for health- and lifespan (or "longevity diets") include:

- modifying the Mediterranean diet as the baseline via nutrition science. For instance, via:
  - (additional) increase in plant-based foods alongside additional restriction of meat intake – meat reduction is (or can be) typically healthy,
  - keeping alcohol consumption of any type at a minimum – conventional Mediterranean diets include alcohol consumption (i.e. of wine), which is under research due to data suggesting negative long-term brain impacts even at low/moderate consumption levels.
  - fully replacing refined grains – some guidelines of Mediterranean diets do not clarify or include the principle of whole-grain consumption instead of refined grains. Whole grains are included in Mediterranean diets.

=== Other approaches ===
Further advanced biosciences-based approaches include:

- Genetic and epigenetic alterations: Human genetic enhancement for pro-longevity and protective genes – see genetics of aging
- Cellular reprogramming: in vivo reprogramming to complement or augment human regenerative capacity and rejuvenate or replace cells
- Epigenetic reprogramming: early-stage research about rejuvenating/repairing epigenetic machinery
- Stem-cell interventions: "Increasing the number and quality of stem cells and activate regenerative signals"
- Nanomedicine: early-stage research of in vivo pro-longevity nanotechnology
- Tissue engineering: of tissues and organs (see also: xenotransplantation and artificial organ)
- Endogenous circulating biomolecules: Blood proteins of blood from young animals have shown some pro-longevity potential in animal studies (e.g. via transfer of blood or plasma, and of plasma proteins). Moreover, exerkines – signalling biomolecules released during/after exercise – have also shown promising results. Exerkines include myokines. Extracellular vesicles were shown to be secreted concomitantly with exerkines and are also investigated. (See also: body fluid and cerebrospinal fluid)
- Personalized interventions: future studies may tailor and investigate personalized medicine-type interventions. For instance, effects of interventions or e.g. dosages may vary per age and/or genome. A review suggests that the field of precision medicine and geroscience will have to interact closely (see also: combination therapy)
- Peptides: such as MOTS-c released by mitochondria
- Mitochondria modulation: early-stage research indicates mitochondrial interventions such as mitochondrial transplantation may have potential to be efficacious (See also: mitochondrial theory of ageing)

==== Within the field ====
There is a need and research into the development of aging biomarkers such as the epigenetic clock "to assess the ageing process and the efficacy of interventions to bypass the need for large-scale longitudinal studies". Such biomarkers may also include in vivo brain imaging.

Reviews sometimes include structured tables that provide systematic overviews of intervention/drug candidates with a review calling for integrating "current knowledge with multi-omics, health records, and drug safety data to predict drugs that can improve health in late life" and listing major outstanding questions. Biological databases of prolongevity drug candidates under research as well as of potential gene/protein targets include GenAge, DrugAge and Geroprotectors.

A review has pointed out that the approach of "'epidemiological' comparison of how a low versus a high consumption of an isolated macronutrient and its association with health and mortality may not only fail to identify protective or detrimental nutrition patterns but may lead to misleading interpretations". It proposes a multi-pillar approach, and summarizes findings towards constructing – multi-system-considering and at least age-personalized dynamic – refined longevity diets. Epidemiological-type observational studies included in meta-analyses should according to the study at least be complemented by "(1) basic research focused on lifespan and healthspan, (2) carefully controlled clinical trials, and (3) studies of individuals and populations with record longevity".

=== Hormone treatment ===
The anti-aging industry offers several hormone therapies. Some of these have been criticized for possible dangers and a lack of proven effect. For example, the American Medical Association has been critical of some anti-aging hormone therapies.

While growth hormone (GH) decreases with age, the evidence for use of growth hormone as an anti-aging therapy is mixed and based mostly on animal studies. There are mixed reports that GH or IGF-1 modulates the aging process in humans and about whether the direction of its effect is positive or negative.

Klotho and exerkines like irisin are being investigated for potential pro-longevity therapies.

=== Lifestyle factors ===
Loneliness/isolation, social life and support, exercise/physical activity (partly via neurobiological effects and increased NAD+ levels), psychological characteristics/personality (possibly highly indirectly), sleep duration, circadian rhythms (patterns of sleep, drug-administration and feeding), type of leisure activities, not smoking, altruistic emotions and behaviors, subjective well-being, mood and stress (including via heat shock protein) are investigated as potential (modulatable) factors of life extension.

Healthy lifestyle practices and healthy diet have been suggested as "first-line function-preserving strategies, with pharmacological agents, including existing and new pharmaceuticals and novel 'nutraceutical' compounds, serving as potential complementary approaches".

=== Societal strategies ===
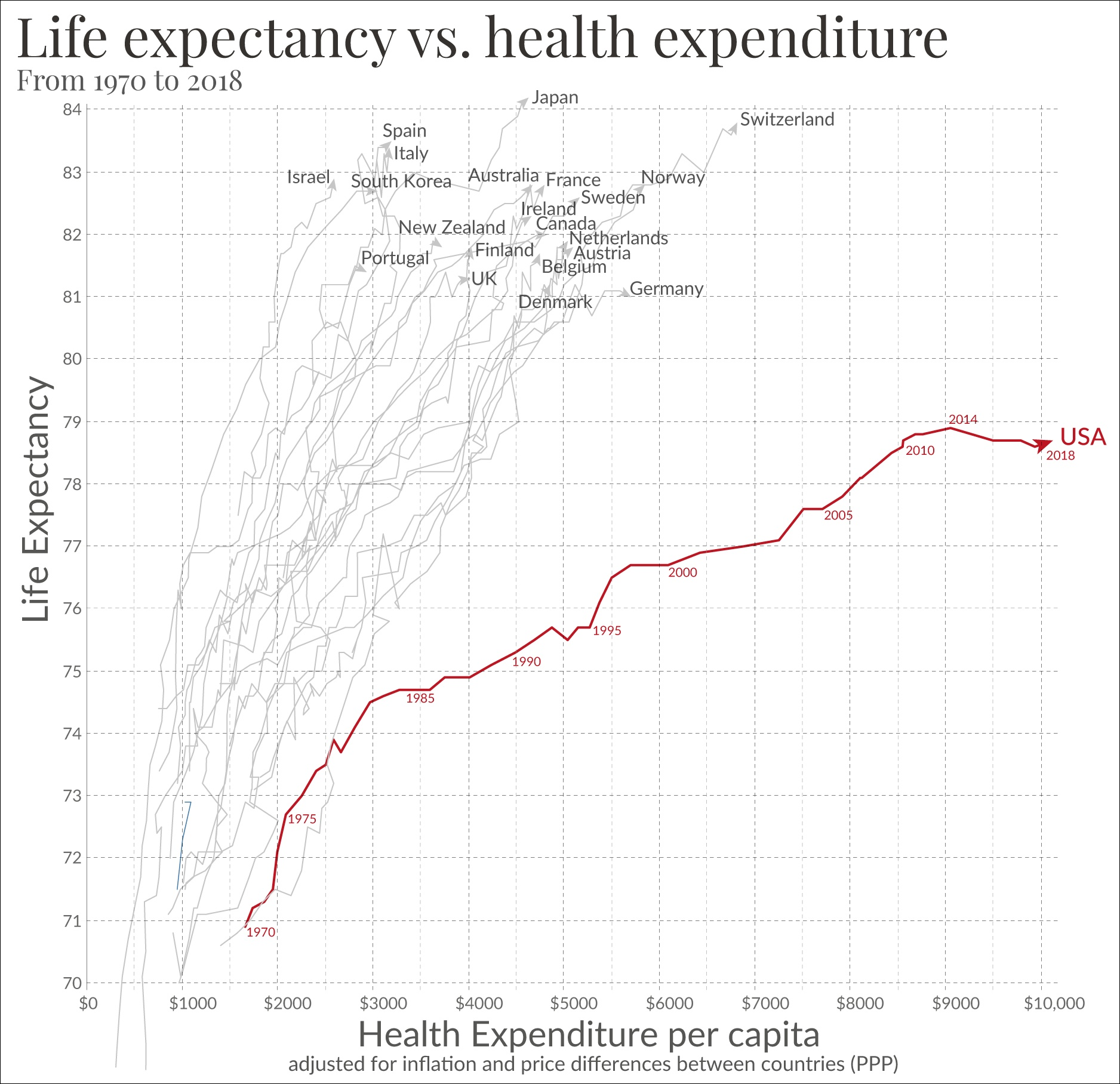
Life expectancy vs healthcare spending of rich OECD countries. US average of $10,447 in 2018.

Collectively, addressing common causes of death could extend lifespans of populations and humanity overall. For instance, a 2020 study indicates that the global mean loss of life expectancy (LLE) from air pollution in 2015 was 2.9 years, substantially more than, for example, 0.3 years from all forms of direct violence, albeit a significant fraction of the LLE (a measure similar to years of potential life lost) is considered to be unavoidable.

Regular screening and doctor visits has been suggested as a lifestyle-societal intervention. (See also: medical test and biomarker)

Health policy and changes to standard healthcare could support the adoption of the field's conclusions – a review suggests that the longevity diet would be a "valuable complement to standard healthcare and that, taken as a preventative measure, it could aid in avoiding morbidity, sustaining health into advanced age" as a form of preventive healthcare.

It has been suggested that in terms of healthy diets, Mediterranean-style diets could be promoted by countries for ensuring healthy-by-default choices ("to ensure the healthiest choice is the easiest choice") and with highly effective measures including dietary education, food checklists and recipes that are "simple, palatable, and affordable".

A review suggests that "targeting the aging process per se may be a far more effective approach to prevent or delay aging-associated pathologies than treatments specifically targeted to particular clinical conditions".

=== Low ambient temperature ===
Low ambient temperature as a physical factor affecting free radical levels was identified as a treatment producing exceptional lifespan increase in Drosophila melanogaster and other living beings.

=== Young blood transfusion ===
As of 2017, some clinics offered injection of blood plasma from young donors. The alleged benefits of the treatment, none of which had been proven, included a longer life. The approach was based on parabiosis studies in mice.

In 2019, after receiving an FDA warning letter to cease giving people plasma infusions, one American company that promoted the treatment, Ambrosia, withdrew from clinical trials it had conducted without FDA approval. The FDA had stated "that some patients are being preyed upon by unscrupulous actors touting treatments of plasma from young donors as cures and remedies."

The treatment appeared in HBO's Silicon Valley fiction series.

=== Microbiome alterations ===
Fecal microbiota transplantation and probiotics are being investigated as means for life and healthspan extension.

== Mind uploading ==
One hypothetical future strategy that, as some suggest, "eliminates" the complications related to a physical body, involves the copying or transferring (e.g. by progressively replacing neurons with transistors) of a conscious mind from a biological brain to a non-biological computer system or computational device. The basic idea is to scan the structure of a particular brain in detail, and then construct a software model of it that is so faithful to the original that, when run on appropriate hardware, it will behave in essentially the same way as the original brain. Whether or not an exact copy of one's mind constitutes actual life extension is matter of debate.

However, critics argue that the uploaded mind would simply be a clone and not a true continuation of a person's consciousness.

Some scientists believe that the dead may one day be "resurrected" through simulation technology.

== See also ==
- Advanced glycation end product
- Aging brain
- Biological immortality
- Centenarian
- DNA damage theory of aging
- Human enhancement
- Immortality
- Maximum lifespan
- Senescence
- Slow aging
- Supercentenarian
