= Methuselah Foundation =

U.S. nonprofit organization

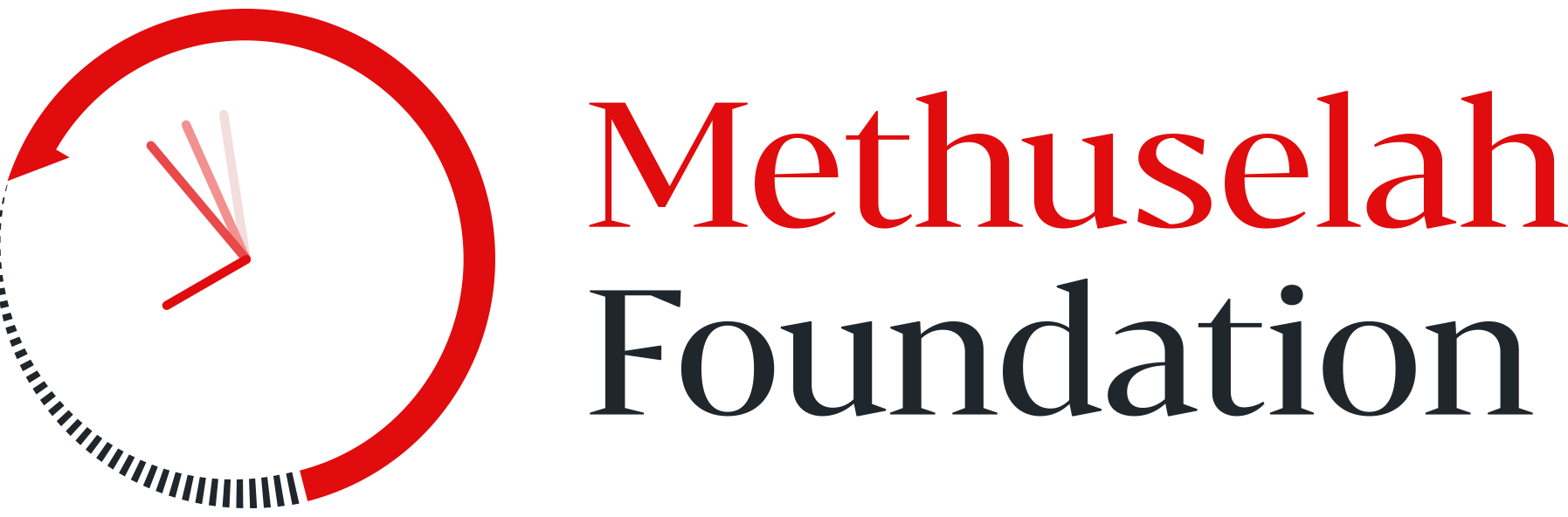
- Formation: 2000; 26 years ago, as the Performance Prize Society
- Founders: David Gobel (co-founders Aubrey de Grey and Dane Gobel)
- Type: 501(c)(3)
- Purpose: Life extension; rejuvenation; tissue engineering
- Location: Springfield, Virginia, U.S.
- Region served: Global
- CEO: David Gobel
- Website: www.mfoundation.org

The Methuselah Foundation is an American non-profit organization based in Springfield, Virginia, and it has funded life extension research.

== History ==
The organization was incorporated by David Gobel in 2001 as the Performance Prize Society. In 2003, David Gobel, Aubrey de Grey, and Dane Gobel rebranded the organization Methuselah Foundation, named after Methuselah (the grandfather of Noah in the Hebrew Bible whose lifespan was claimed to be 969 years). The new name was introduced at the 32nd Annual Meeting of the American Aging Association, along with an award to Andrej Bartke for his work on mice that lived the equivalent of 180 human years.

The foundation's work includes funding scientific research, as well as incubating and investing in early-stage life science companies.

== Projects ==
=== Methuselah Funds ===
The Methuselah Funds (M Fund) was created in 2017 by the Methuselah Foundation to invest in early-stage companies.

=== NASA Challenge partnerships ===
In 2016, NASA in partnership with the New Organ Alliance announced the Vascular Tissue Challenge. The Vascular Tissue Challenge offered a $500,000 prize awarded to two teams.

In November 2016, in conjunction with the Vascular Tissue Challenge, the New Organ Alliance hosted at the NASA Research Park the Vascular Tissue Challenge Roadmapping Workshop, with funding from the NSF.

In 2021, Methuselah announced a second collaboration with NASA, the Deep Space Food Challenge, which awarded prizes to 18 U.S. teams for food production technology for long-duration space missions.

=== Alliance for Longevity Initiatives ===
The Alliance for Longevity Initiatives organization has funded longevity projects such as bioengineered patient trials and dramatically improved biomedical research models that use engineered human tissue.

=== New Parts for People ===
Methuselah Foundation contributed $1 million to the Albert Einstein College of Medicine.

=== 3D bioprinter grants ===
In 2013, Methuselah Foundation began a partnership with Organovo to fund the use of their 3D bioprinters at academic research centers for biomedical research. The foundation committed "at least $500,000 in direct funding for research projects across several institutions." The first recipients were Yale School of Medicine, UCSF School of Medicine, and the Murdoch Children's Research Institute.

=== Bowhead whale genome ===
In 2015, with funding from the Methuselah Foundation and Life Extension Foundation, the bowhead whale genome was sequenced by João Pedro de Magalhães and his team at the University of Liverpool. The bowhead whale is possibly the longest-lived mammal, capable of living over 270 years. The genome project was undertaken to learn more about the mammal's mechanisms for longevity and resistance to age-related diseases, which are unknown. An assembly of the bowhead whale genome has been made available online.

=== New Organ Alliance ===
The Methuselah Foundation sponsored the New Organ Alliance, an initiative to alleviate organ donation shortages. In 2013, the foundation announced the New Organ Liver Prize, a $1,000,000 award to the first team that can create a bioengineered or regenerative liver therapy.

New Organ Alliance partnered with the Organ Preservation Alliance and was funded through the National Science Foundation (NSF) and Methuselah Foundation. and "Bioengineering Priorities on a Path to Ending Organ Shortage".

In 2016, NASA and the New Organ Alliance announced the Vascular Tissue Challenge. The Vascular Tissue Challenge offers a $500,000 prize "to be divided among the first three teams that successfully create thick, metabolically-functional human vascularized organ tissue in a controlled laboratory environment."

In November 2016, with the Vascular Tissue Challenge, the New Organ Alliance hosted the Vascular Tissue Challenge Roadmapping Workshop, with funding from the NSF.

=== Organ Preservation Alliance ===
In 2013, Methuselah collaborated with the Organ Preservation Alliance.

=== Supercentenarian Research Foundation ===
In 2006, Methuselah contributed capital and fiscal sponsorship to launch the Supercentenarian Research Foundation (SRF) to study supercentenarians (people over 110 years of age).

== SENS Research Foundation ==
From 2003 to 2009, Methuselah Foundation served as the backbone organization for the strategies for engineered negligible senescence (SENS) program, a long-term research framework developed by Aubrey de Grey. The SENS program aimed to prevent or reverse seven forms of molecular or cellular damage associated with aging.

During that time, de Grey and David Gobel established SENS-related research programs on human bioremedial biology at Rice University and Arizona State University. The programs used environmental remediation principles directed at reversing "pollution" in human cells. Methuselah sponsored a series of SENS-focused roundtables and conferences.

Under de Grey's leadership, SENS spun out from Methuselah as the SENS Research Foundation in 2009.

== Monetary support ==
In 2004, the Methuselah Foundation was funded by 300 donors. In 2015, the foundation created a monument to the 300 donors from this initiative at St. Thomas Island in the U.S. Virgin Islands.

On September 16, 2006, Peter Thiel announced that he was pledging $3.5 million to the Methuselah Foundation and the SENS programs.

In 2007, Justin Bonomo, a professional poker player, pledged 5% of his tournament winnings to SENS research.

In January 2018, the anonymous principal of the Pineapple Fund donated $1 million to the Methuselah Foundation, in addition to $2 million donated to SENS Research Foundation.

On May 12, 2021, Vitalik Buterin, co-founder of Ethereum, made a series of donations to the foundation.
