= Rejuvenation =

Medical discipline focused on the practical reversal of the aging process

Rejuvenation is a medical discipline focused on the practical reversal of the aging process.

Rejuvenation is distinct from life extension. Life extension strategies often study the causes of aging and try to oppose those causes to slow aging. Rejuvenation is the reversal of aging and thus requires a different strategy, namely repair of the damage that is associated with aging or replacement of damaged tissue with new tissue. Rejuvenation can be a means of life extension, but most life extension strategies do not involve rejuvenation.

== Historical and cultural background ==
Various myths tell the stories about the quest for rejuvenation. It was believed that magic or intervention of a supernatural power can bring back youth and many mythical adventurers set out on a journey to do that, for themselves, their relatives or some authority that sent them anonymously.

An ancient Chinese emperor sent out ships of young men and women to find a pearl that would rejuvenate him. This led to a myth among modern Chinese that Japan was founded by these people.

In some religions, people were to be rejuvenated after death prior to placing them in heaven.

The stories continued well into the 16th century. The Spanish explorer Juan Ponce de León led an expedition around the Caribbean islands and into Florida to find the Fountain of Youth. Led by the rumors, the expedition continued the search and many perished. The Fountain was nowhere to be found as locals were unaware of its exact location.

Since the emergence of philosophy, sages and self-proclaimed wizards always made enormous efforts to find the secret of youth, both for themselves and their noble patrons and sponsors. It was widely believed that some potions may restore the youth.

Another commonly cited approach was attempting to transfer the essence of youth from young people to old. Some examples of this approach were sleeping with virgins or children (sometimes literally sleeping, not necessarily having sex), bathing in or drinking their blood.

The quest for rejuvenation reached its height with alchemy. All around Europe, and also beyond, alchemists were looking for the Philosopher's Stone, the mythical substance that, as it was believed, could not only turn lead into gold, but also prolong life and restore youth. Although the set goal was not achieved, alchemy paved the way to the scientific method and so to the medical advances of today.

Serge Abrahamovitch Voronoff was a French surgeon born in Russia who gained fame for his technique of grafting monkey testicle tissue on to the testicles of men while working in France in the 1920s and 1930s. This was one of the first medically accepted rejuvenation therapies (before he was proved to be wrong around 1930–1940). The technique brought him a great deal of money, although he was already independently wealthy. As his work fell out of favor, he went from being a highly respected surgeon to a subject of ridicule. By the early 1930s, over 500 men had been treated in France by his rejuvenation technique, and thousands more around the world, such as in a special clinic set up in Algiers. Noteworthy people who had the surgery included Harold McCormick, chairman of the board of International Harvester Company, and the aging premier of Turkey.

Rejuvenation technology and its effects on individuals and society have long been a subject of science fiction. The Misspent Youth and Commonwealth Saga by Peter F. Hamilton are among the most well known examples of this, dealing with the short- and long-term effects of a near perfect 80-year-old to 20-year-old body change with mind intact. The less perfect rejuvenation featured in the Mars trilogy by Kim Stanley Robinson results in long-term memory loss and sheer boredom that comes with extreme age. The post-mortal characters in the Revelation Space series have long-term or essentially infinite lifespans, and sheer boredom induces them to undertake activities of extreme risk.

== Modern developments ==
Aging is the accumulation of damage to macromolecules, cells, tissues and organs in and on the body which, when it can no longer be tolerated by an organism, ultimately leads to its death. If any of that damage can be repaired, the result is rejuvenation.

For example, a 2009 study reported that rapamycin extended both median and maximal lifespan of genetically heterogeneous laboratory mice. thereby achieving life extension. A few experimental methods such as replacing hormones to youthful levels have had considerable success in partially rejuvenating laboratory animals and humans. A 2011 experiment involved breeding genetically manipulated mice that lacked an enzyme called telomerase, causing the mice to age prematurely and suffer ailments. When the mice were given injections to reactivate the enzyme, it repaired the damaged tissues and reversed the signs of aging. There are at least eight important hormones that decline with age: 1. human growth hormone (HGH); 2. the sexual hormones: testosterone or oestrogen/progesterone; 3. erythropoietin (EPO); 4. insulin; 5. DHEA; 6. melatonin; 7. thyroid; 8. pregnenolone. In theory, if all or some of these hormones are replaced, the body will respond to them as it did when it was younger, thus repairing and restoring many body functions. In line with this, recent experiments show that heterochronic parabiosis, i.e. connecting the circulatory systems of young and old animal, leads to the rejuvenation of the old animal, including restoration of proper stem cell function. Similar experiments show that grafting old muscles into young hosts leads to their complete restoration, whereas grafting young muscles into old hosts does not. These experiments show that aging is mediated by systemic environment, rather than being an intrinsic cell property. Clinical trials based on transfusion of young blood were scheduled to begin in 2014. Another intervention that is gaining popularity is epigenetic reprogramming. Through the use of Yamanaka factors, aged cells can revert to a younger state. It has been demonstrated that reprogramming induces a youthful epigenetic state and can restore vision after injury. Only through reprogramming were stochastic epigenetic variations, which accumulate with age, successfully reversed, as demonstrated by a stochastic data-based clock.

Most attempts at genetic repair have traditionally involved the use of a retrovirus to insert a new gene into a random position on a chromosome. But by attaching zinc fingers (which determine where transcription factors bind) to endonucleases (which break DNA strands), homologous recombination can be induced to correct and replace defective (or undesired) DNA sequences. The first applications of this technology are to isolate stem cells from the bone marrow of patients having blood disease mutations, to correct those mutations in laboratory dishes using zinc finger endonucleases and to transplant the stem cells back into the patients. More recent efforts leverage CRISPR-Cas systems or adeno-associated viruses (AAVs).

Enhanced DNA repair has been proposed as a potential rejuvenation strategy.

Stem cell regenerative medicine uses three different strategies:

1. Implantation of stem cells from culture into an existing tissue structure
2. Implantation of stem cells into a tissue scaffold that guides restoration
3. Induction of residual cells of a tissue structure to regenerate the necessary body part

A salamander can not only regenerate a limb, but can regenerate the lens or retina of an eye and can regenerate an intestine. For regeneration the salamander tissues form a blastema by de-differentiation of mesenchymal cells, and the blastema functions as a self-organizing system to regenerate the limb.

Yet another option involves cosmetic changes to the individual to create the appearance of youth. These are generally superficial and do little to make the person healthier or live longer, but the real improvement in a person's appearance may elevate their mood and have positive side effects normally correlated with happiness. Cosmetic surgery is a large industry offering treatments such as removal of wrinkles ("face lift"), removal of extra fat (liposuction) and reshaping or augmentation of various body parts (abdomen, breasts, face).

There are also, as commonly found throughout history, many fake rejuvenation products that have been shown to be ineffective. Chief among these are powders, sprays, gels, and homeopathic substances that claim to contain growth hormones. Authentic growth hormones are only effective when injected, mainly due to the fact that the 191-amino acid protein is too large to be absorbed through the mucous membranes, and would be broken up in the stomach if swallowed.

The Mprize scientific competition is under way to deliver on the mission of extending healthy human life. It directly accelerates the development of revolutionary new life extension therapies by awarding two cash prizes: one to the research team that breaks the world record for the oldest-ever mouse; and one to the team that develops the most successful late-onset rejuvenation. Current Mprize winner for rejuvenation is Steven Spindler. Caloric restriction (CR), the consumption of fewer calories while avoiding malnutrition, was applied as a method of decelerating aging and the development of age-related diseases.

In 2020, scientists reported the reversion of ageing in human cells through nuclear reprogramming to pluripotency. Such process included resetting of epigenetic clock, reduction of the inflammatory profile in chondrocytes and restoration of youthful regenerative response to aged, human muscle stem cells, without abolishing cellular identity.

== Strategies for engineered negligible senescence ==
The biomedical gerontologist Aubrey de Grey has initiated a project, strategies for engineered negligible senescence (SENS), to study how to reverse the damage caused by aging. He has proposed seven strategies for what he calls the seven deadly sins of aging:

1. Cell loss can be repaired (reversed) just by suitable exercise in the case of muscle. For other tissues it needs various growth factors to stimulate cell division, or in some cases it needs stem cells.
2. Senescent cells can be removed by activating the immune system against them. Or they can be destroyed by gene therapy to introduce "suicide genes" that only kill senescent cells.
3. Protein cross-linking can largely be reversed by drugs that break the links. But to break some of the cross-links we may need to develop enzymatic methods.
4. Extracellular garbage (like amyloid) can be eliminated by vaccination that gets immune cells to "eat" the garbage.
5. For intracellular junk we need to introduce new enzymes, possibly enzymes from soil bacteria, that can degrade the junk (lipofuscin) that our own natural enzymes cannot degrade.
6. For mitochondrial mutations the plan is not to repair them but to prevent harm from the mutations by putting suitably modified copies of the mitochondrial genes into the cell nucleus by gene therapy. The mitochondrial DNA experiences a high degree of mutagenic damage because most free radicals are generated in the mitochondria. A copy of the mitochondrial DNA located in the nucleus will be better protected from free radicals, and there will be better DNA repair when damage occurs. All mitochondrial proteins would then be imported into the mitochondria.
7. For cancer (the most lethal consequence of mutations) the strategy is to use gene therapy to delete the genes for telomerase and to eliminate telomerase-independent mechanisms of turning normal cells into "immortal" cancer cells. To compensate for the loss of telomerase in stem cells we would introduce new stem cells every decade or so.

In 2009, Aubrey de Grey co-founded the SENS Foundation to expedite progress in the above-listed areas.

== Scientific journal ==
- Rejuvenation Research Editor: Aubrey de Grey. Publisher: Mary Ann Liebert, Inc. ISSN 1549-1684 – Published Bimonthly.

== See also ==
- Aging brain
- American Academy of Anti-Aging Medicine
- Anti-aging movement
- Biogerontology
- Biological immortality
- DNA repair
- DNA damage theory of aging
- Eternal youth
- Facial rejuvenation
- Fountain of Youth
- Hayflick
- Hayflick limit
- Immortality
- Indefinite lifespan
- Kayakalpa
- Life extension
- Maximum life span
- Nanomedicine
- Photorejuvenation
- SAGE KE
- Senescence
- Shunamitism
- Telomere
- Telomerase
- Tissue engineering
- Therapeutic cloning
- Neoteny
