= To Age or Not to Age =

- Theatrical release poster
- Directed by: Robert Kane Pappas
- Written by: Robert Kane Pappas
- Produced by: Miriam Foley; Joseph Zock
- Cinematography: Robert Kane Pappas
- Edited by: Robert Kane Pappas
- Music by: Spider Barbour; Paul Groueff; Mira Spektor
- Production company: Sag Harbor Basement Pictures
- Distributed by: Sag Harbor Basement Pictures
- Release date: July 16, 2010
- Country: United States
- Language: English

To Age or Not to Age is a documentary film directed by Robert Kane Pappas with Steven N. Austad, Ph.D., Rev. Nicanor Pier Giorgio Austriaco, O.P., Ph.D., Nir Barzilai, M.D., Troy Duster, Aubrey de Grey, Leonard P. Guarente, Cynthia Kenyon, Tom Kirkwood, Gordon Lithgow, Ph.D., David Sinclair and Christoph Westphal. The screenwriter was Robert Kane Pappas. The film was produced by Miriam Foley and Joseph Zock. The film opened at the Village East Cinema in New York City on July 16, 2010.

== Plot summary ==
It is a documentary that features interviews with the pioneers in the field of anti-aging research at Harvard, MIT, Cambridge and other research centers.

== Cast ==
- Steven N. Austad, Ph.D.
- Rev. Nicanor Pier Giorgio Austriaco, O.P., Ph.D.
- Nir Barzilai, M.D.
- Troy Duster, Ph.D.
- Aubrey de Grey, Ph.D.
- Leonard P. Guarente, Ph.D.
- Cynthia Kenyon, Ph.D.
- Dr. Thomas Kirkwood
- Gordon Lithgow, Ph.D.
- David Sinclair, Ph.D.
- Christoph Westphal, Ph.D.
