= Christoph Westphal =

American biomedical entrepreneur

- Education: Harvard Medical School; Columbia College
- Scientific career
- Fields: Biomedicine

Christoph Westphal is an American biomedical businessman.

== Background and training ==
Westphal graduated from Columbia College of Columbia University, summa cum laude, in 1990 and finished the MD–PhD program at Harvard University in six years.

== Career ==
He worked at McKinsey & Company for two years after getting his degrees.

From 2000 to 2005 he was a partner at Polaris Venture Partners, a venture capital firm.

=== VC and Serial Entrepreneur ===
As Founder/CEO and lead investor, Westphal has taken 7 companies public on NASDAQ, with a combined sustained market cap/exit value of over $70 billion. These include Alnylam, Acceleron, and Momenta. In 2001, he worked with Robert Langer to found Mimeon based on work by Langer on glycoengineering; the company changed its name to Momenta Pharmaceuticals the next year and went public in 2004. Westphal was the founding CEO. Momenta brought to market the first generic, low-molecular-weight heparin.

To expand the portfolio of treatments for autoimmune disorders, Johnson & Johnson acquired Momenta Pharmaceuticals for $6.5 billion in an all-cash deal in 2020, after nipocalimab, a treatment developed by Momenta received a rare paediatric disease designation from the US Food and Drug Administration.

In 2002, he co-founded Alnylam Pharmaceuticals as CEO, which was built to discover and develop drugs and reagents based on RNA interference based on work done by scientists Phillip Sharp, Paul Schimmel, David Bartel, and Thomas Tuschl; John Maraganore was hired as CEO in 2002. The company held its IPO in 2004, one of the few biotech companies able to do so in a down market. As of 2016 Alnylam remained the dominant company in the RNAi field. Alnylam has achieved approval for 5 medicines.

In 2003, he co-founded Acceleron Pharma as CEO with scientists Jasbir Seehra, Tom Maniatis, Mark Ptashne, Wylie Vale, and scientific advisor Joan Massague, and John Knopf. The company was founded to discover and develop drugs based on the scientific discoveries of the scientific founders in the field of growth factors and transforming growth factors in the fields of metabolic disorders like obesity, diabetes, osteoporosis, and muscle-wasting conditions. The company went public in September 2013. Acceleron was acquired for $11.5 billion on Sep 30, 2021 by Merck.

In 2004, he co-founded Sirtris Pharmaceuticals as CEO with Harvard biologist David Sinclair, serial entrepreneur Andrew Perlman, Richard Aldrich, Richard Pops, and Paul Schimmel. The company focused on resveratrol formulations and derivatives as activators of the SIRT1 enzyme. The company's initial product was called SRT501, and was a formulation of resveratrol. Westphal and Sinclair aggressively marketed investment in the company as an anti-aging opportunity, which was controversial but effective; Westphal raised $100 million in 2006. In 2005 Westphal recruited Michelle Dipp to join the team at Sirtris; she would work with him in several subsequent ventures.

In 2006, Westphal worked with Aldrich and Roger Tung to found and get seed funding for Concert Pharmaceuticals based on Tung's ideas about using deuterium to make deuterated drugs. Westphal was not involved in the company by the time it went public in 2014.

Sirtris went public in 2007 and was subsequently purchased and made a subsidiary of GlaxoSmithKline in 2008 for $720 million. GSK paid $22.50/share, when Sirtris's stock was trading at $12/share, down 45% from its highest price of the previous year. Westphal was made CEO of the subsidiary and appointed Senior Vice President of GSK's Center of Excellence for External Drug Discovery (CEEDD) unit. Sirtris' science and claims were controversial; studies published in 2009 and early 2010 by scientists from Amgen and Pfizer cast doubt on whether SIRT1 was directly activated by resveratrol and showed that the apparent activity was actually due to a fluorescent reagent used in the experiments, and were widely discussed.

In 2008, Westphal worked with Dipp, Aldrich, and Alexey Margolin to found Alnara Pharmaceuticals, which was created to develop ways to formulate biopharmaceuticals so they could be taken by mouth, instead of by injection. Margolin had been CEO of Altus Therapeutics, which had been developing liprotamase, which it had licensed from the Cystic Fibrosis Foundation, but ran out of money. Alnara acquired the license and focused its resources on further developing liprotamase; Eli Lilly and Company acquired Alnara in July 2010 on the promise of that data acquired by Alnara. Lilly submitted a new drug application to the FDA in 2011, which the FDA rejected, finding no clear benefit over existing products and requiring an additional clinical trial. Lilly took a $122.6 million write-down on the value of the asset, and then sold it to Anthera Pharmaceuticals in 2014.

In February 2010, Westphal formed a new venture fund called Longwood Fund, together with Aldrich and Dipp.

In April 2010, Westphal stepped down as CEO of Sirtris and as Senior VP of GSK's CEEDD and Dipp took over those roles; Westphal took over leadership of GSK's venture unit, SR One.

In August 2010, a nonprofit called the Healthy Lifespan Institute, which had been formed the year before by Westphal and Dipp, began selling SRT501 as a dietary supplement online; when this become public GSK required Westphal and Dipp, who were still GSK employees, to resign from the nonprofit.

GSK/Sirtris terminated development of SRT501 in late 2010. In 2013 GSK shut down Sirtris and its development candidates were absorbed into GSK, where research and development continued.

Also in August 2010, the Longwood team co-founded VeraStem by providing seed funding and office space in its own offices, with Westphal as CEO and chairman; Verastem aimed to isolate cancer stem cells and then discover drugs that would selectively kill them. He brought the company public in 2012 and stepped down as CEO in 2013, as the company was getting ready to start a clinical trial of its lead product, a drug intended to treat mesothelioma.

In April 2011, Westphal left SR One to focus on Longwood; news reports said that Dipp would soon leave GSK in order to focus on Longwood as well.

In 2011, Westphal, Dipp. and Aldrich co-founded OvaScience with Jonathan Tilly and Sinclair, based on scientific work done by Tilly concerning mammalian oogonial stem cells and work on mitochondria by Sinclair. Tilly's work was controversial, with some groups unable to replicate it. The company's claims about its services were controversial from their first announcements. The company's A financing round was $6 million and it raised a $37 million B round in early 2012; Longwood participated in both rounds. OvaScience held its public offering in 2012, and part of its pitch to investors was that its services would probably not be regulated by the FDA so it would probably be able to start generating significant revenue in the US by the end of 2013, but in 2013 the FDA ruled that it would need to file an investigational new drug application before it could start marketing the service; OvaScience's shares fell 40% in response. By September 2016 OvaScience had raised and spent around $228 million. In early December its shares were trading at around $3; in mid-December 2016 the company's shares fell around 50% when it announced layoffs and the departure of its CEO and chief operating officer in the face of sales continuing to fall below expectations.

In 2014, he co-founded Flex Pharma with Jennifer Cermak (from Sirtris) based on work by scientific co-founders Roderick MacKinnon of Rockefeller University and Bruce Bean of Harvard Medical School. MacKinnon and Bean invented a dietary supplement for treating and preventing muscle cramps in athletes that contained ginger extract, cinnamon extract and capsicum, and tested it in clinical trials. In 2014 the company described itself as a developer of drugs for neuromuscular disorders, pursuing treatments muscle cramping across a range of conditions including multiple sclerosis, ALS, and cramping in athletes, based on MacKinnon's Nobel Prize winning work on ion channels, and raised a $40 million Series A round. The company had a $86 million initial public offering in 2015 and revealed the dietary supplement product and its intent to go to market as a dietary supplement company at that time. The similarities with Sirtris' emphasis on reservatrol were noted at the time. In 2016, Flex Pharma released the consumer product "HotShot" as a dietary supplement for endurance athletes. In October 2016 the company released data from a clinical trial of its lead drug candidate for nocturnal leg cramps FLX-787, in which FLX-787 failed to meet the primary endpoints. In June 2017 Westphal stepped down as CEO. In June 2018 the company halted clinical development of the drug candidate due to tolerability issues, cut its workforce, and said it was considering its strategy. In July 2018 MacKinnon resigned from the board of directors.

From 2017 to 2023, Westphal as Ceo founded TScan (now publicly traded $TCRX) with Lasker winner Steve Elledge (Harvard Med), Immunitas with Kai Wucherpfennig (Dana Farber / Harvard Med), DEM with Jonathan Weissman of MIT, and Solu Therapeutics (spin out of GSK). In addition he continued to run Longwood Fund, reaching $750 million of assets under management in a series of biotech venture capital funds.

== Board positions ==
Westphal is or has been on the Board of Fellows of Harvard Medical School, the Board of Trustees of the Boston Symphony Orchestra, the board of Biotechnology Innovation Organization (BIO), and as a member of the Boston Commercial Club. Westphal is a minority owner of the Boston Celtics.

== Honors ==
- 2002 – Listed as one of the Top Innovators Under 35 in the annual MIT Technology Review
- 2006 – Ernst & Young’s New England Entrepreneur of the Year award in the Biopharmaceutical category
- 2007 – Mass High Tech All Star Award
- 2008 – Outstanding Individual of the Year Award at the annual Laguna Biotech CEO Meeting
- 2008 – Corporate Leader Award of Distinction from the American Federation for Aging Research (AFAR)
- 2008 – Recognition in the Pharmaceutical Executive “45 Under 45,”
- 2008 – Recognition in the PharmaVOICE 100, a list of the 100 most inspiring people in the life-sciences industry
- 2009 – Stevie Award for Executive of the Year from The 2009 American Business Awards
- 2009 – E-3 Public Company Science & Technology Company Executive Award at the annual Emerald Investment Forum
- 2010 – Named one of Fortune's Fortune Visionaries
