= List of life sciences =

Branches of science that involve the scientific study of life

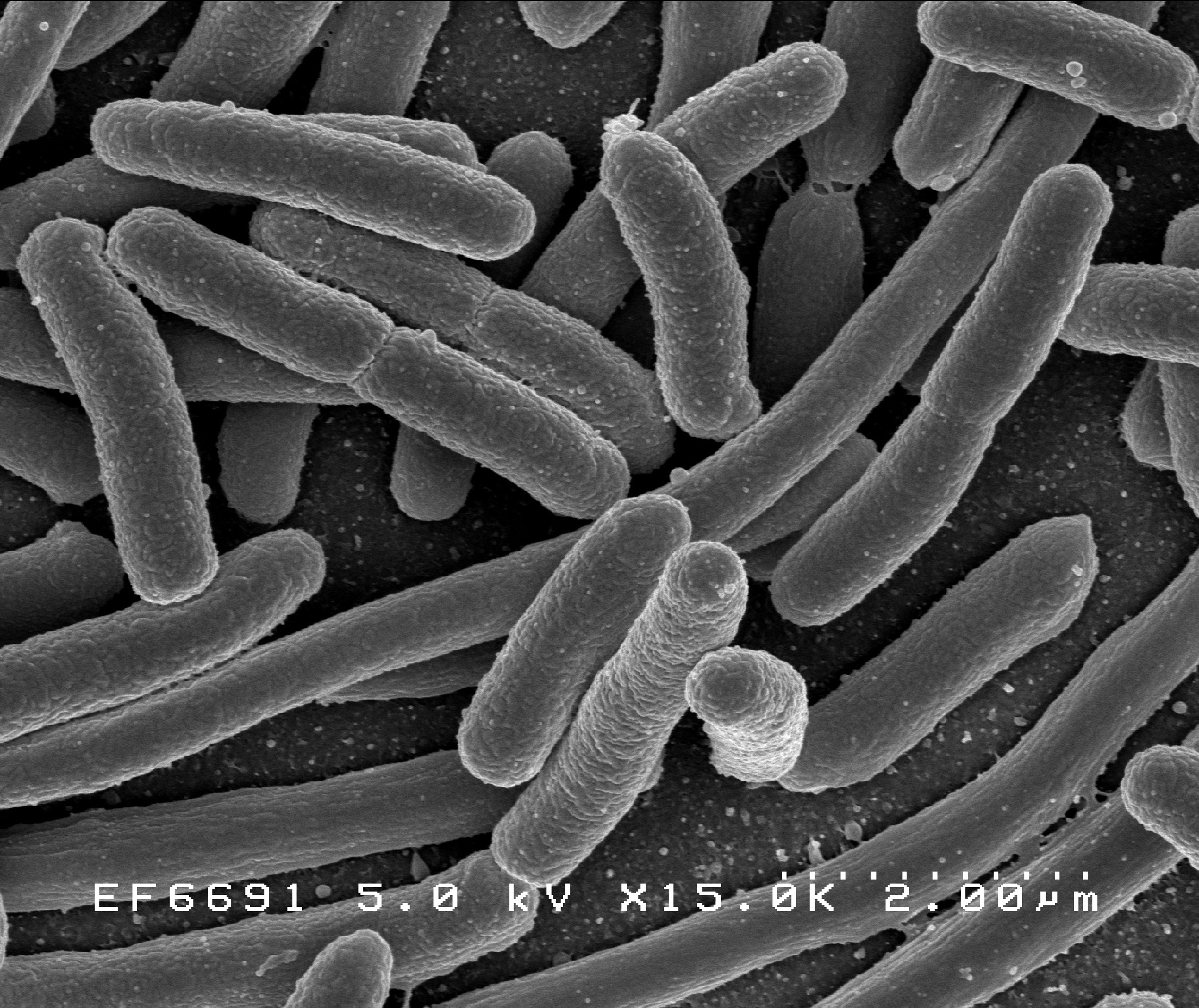
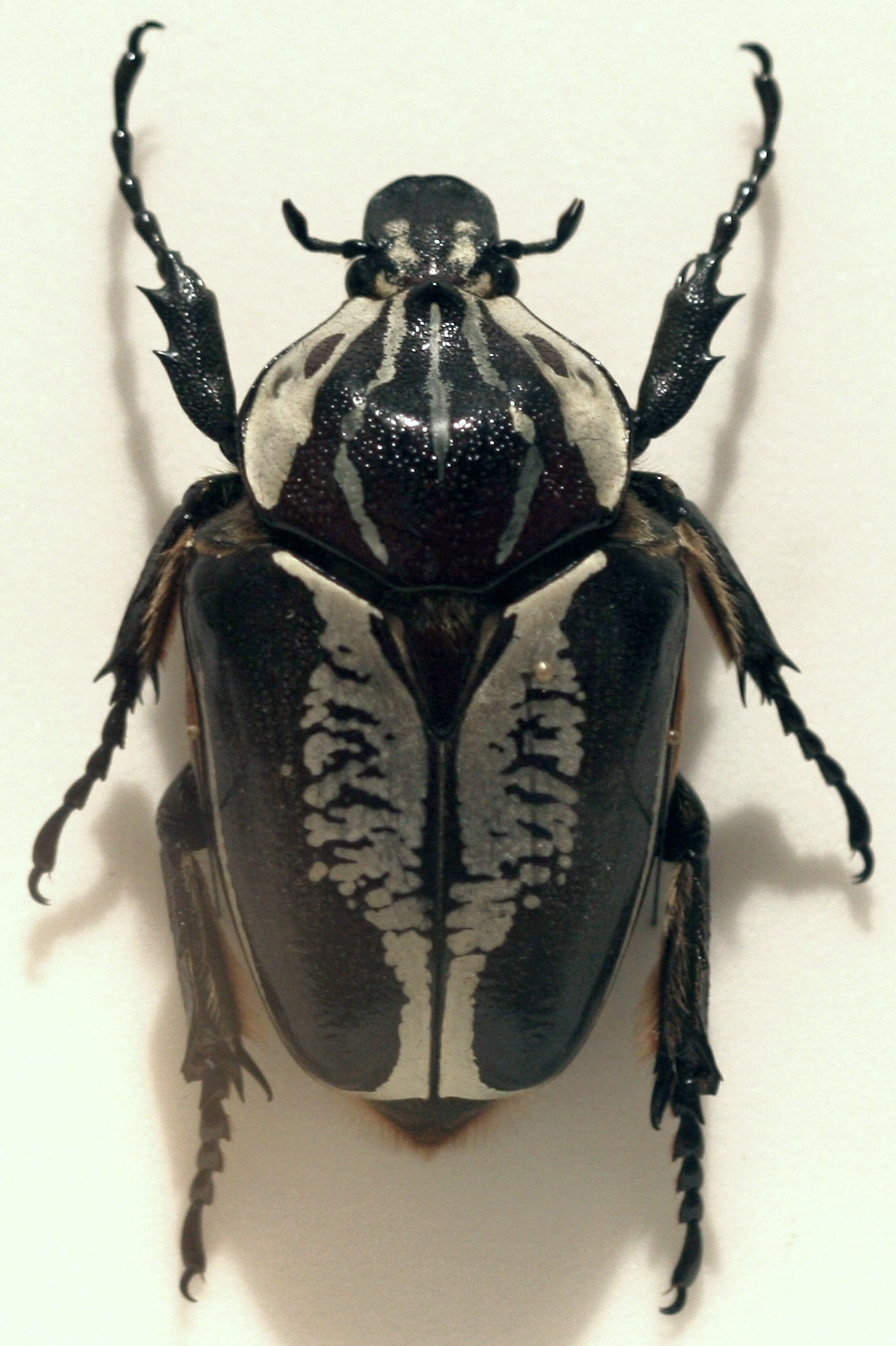
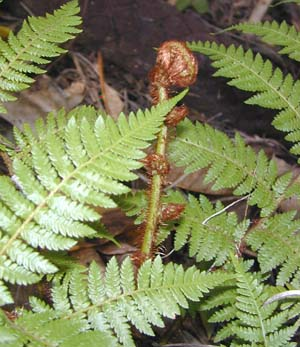
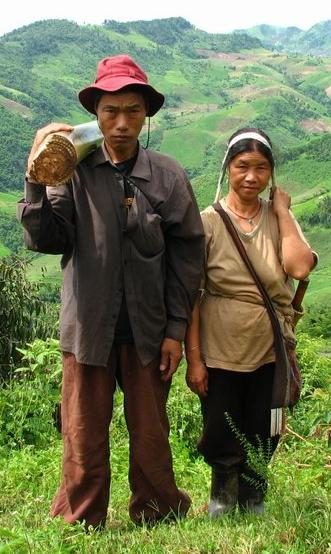
Different kinds of living creatures studied in life sciences
- top: microorganisms (E. coli bacteria) and an animal (Goliath beetle)
- bottom: a plant (tree fern) and humans

This list of life sciences comprises the branches of science that involve the scientific study of life — such as animals (including human beings), microorganisms, and plants. This is one of the two major branches of natural science, the other being physical science, which is concerned with non-living matter. Biology is the overall natural science that studies life, with the other life sciences as its sub-disciplines.

Some life sciences focus on a specific type of organism. For example, zoology is the study of animals, while botany is the study of plants. Other life sciences focus on aspects common to all or many life forms, such as anatomy and genetics. Some focus on the micro scale (e.g., molecular biology, biochemistry), while others focus on larger scales (e.g., cytology, immunology, ethology, pharmacy, ecology). Another major branch of life sciences involves understanding the mind—neuroscience. Life-science discoveries are helpful in improving the quality and standard of life and have applications in health, agriculture, medicine, and the pharmaceutical and food science industries. For example, they have provided information on certain diseases, which has helped in the understanding of human health.

== Basic life science branches ==
- Anatomy – study of form in animals, plants and other organisms, or specifically in humans. Simply, the study of internal structure of living organisms.
  - Physiology – study of the internal workings of organisms and the functions of anatomical structures.
  - Comparative anatomy – the study of evolution of species through similarities and differences in their anatomy.
  - Gross anatomy – study of anatomy at the macroscopic level
  - Histology – also known as microscopic anatomy or microanatomy, the branch of biology which studies the microscopic anatomy of biological tissues.
  - Neuroanatomy – the study of the nervous system.
  - Osteology – study of bones.
  - Radiographic anatomy – study of anatomy through radiography
  - Surface anatomy – study of external features of a body
- Biochemistry – study of the chemical reactions required for life to exist and function, usually with a focus on the cellular level.
- Biophysics – study of biological processes through the methods traditionally used in the physical sciences.
  - Biomechanics – the study of the mechanics of living beings.
  - Cellular biophysics – study of physical principles underlying cell function
  - Neurophysics – study of the development of the nervous system on a molecular level.
  - Molecular biophysics – study of physical properties of biomolecules at the molecular level
  - Quantum biology – application of quantum mechanics and theoretical chemistry to biological objects and problems.
  - Virophysics – study of mechanics and dynamics driving the interactions between viruses and cells.
- Biotechnology – new and sometimes controversial branch of biology that studies the manipulation of living matter, including genetic modification and synthetic biology.
  - Bioinformatics – use of information technology for the study, collection, and storage of genomic and other biological data.
  - Bioengineering – study of biology through the means of engineering with an emphasis on applied knowledge and especially related to biotechnology.
  - Synthetic biology – research integrating biology and engineering; construction of biological functions not found in nature.
- Botany – study of plants.
  - Economic botany – study of relationship between people and plants, including the practical uses of plants
  - Ethnobotany – study of a region's plants and their usage by people
  - Photobiology – scientific study of the interactions of light (technically, non-ionizing radiation) and living organisms. The field includes the study of photosynthesis, photomorphogenesis, visual processing, circadian rhythms, bioluminescence, and ultraviolet radiation effects.
  - Phycology – scientific study of algae.
  - Plant anatomy – study of internal structure of plants
  - Plant ecology – study of how plants interact with each other and their environment
  - Plant genetics – study of heredity and variation in plants
  - Plant pathology – study of plant diseases
  - Plant physiology – subdiscipline of botany concerned with the functioning, or physiology, of plants.
- Cell biology – study of the cell as a complete unit, and the molecular and chemical interactions that occur within a living cell.
  - Histology – study of the anatomy of cells and tissues of plants and animals using microscopy.
- Chronobiology – field of biology that examines periodic (cyclic) phenomena in living organisms and their adaptation to solar- and lunar-related rhythms.
  - Dendrochronology – study of tree rings, using them to date the exact year they were formed in order to analyze atmospheric conditions during different periods in natural history.
- Developmental biology – study of the processes through which an organism forms, from zygote to full structure
  - Embryology – study of the development of embryos (from fecundation to birth).
  - Gerontology – study of aging processes.
- Ecology – study of the interactions of living organisms with one another and with the non-living elements of their environment.
  - Behavioral ecology – the study of the evolutionary basis for animal behavior due to ecological pressure
  - Ecosystem ecology – study of biotic and abiotic components of ecosystems and their interactions within an ecosystem
  - Landscape ecology – study of relationships between ecological processes in the environment and particular ecosystems
  - Microbial ecology – study of the relationships between microorganisms and their environments
  - Population ecology – study of dynamics of species populations and how these populations interact with the environment
  - Urban ecology – study of the relationships between living organisms with each other and their urban environment.
  - Biogeography – study of the distribution of species spatially and temporally.
- Evolutionary biology – study of the origin and descent of species over time.
  - Evolutionary developmental biology – field of biology that compares the developmental processes of different organisms to determine the ancestral relationship between them, and to discover how developmental processes evolved.
  - Paleobiology – discipline which combines the methods and findings of the life sciences with the methods and findings of the earth science, paleontology.
    - Paleoanthropology – the study of fossil evidence for human evolution, mainly using remains from extinct hominin and other primate species to determine the morphological and behavioral changes in the human lineage, as well as the environment in which human evolution occurred.
    - Paleobotany – study of fossil plants.
    - Paleontology – study of fossils and sometimes geographic evidence of prehistoric life.
    - Paleopathology – the study of pathogenic conditions observable in bones or mummified soft tissue, and on nutritional disorders, variation in stature or morphology of bones over time, evidence of physical trauma, or evidence of occupationally derived biomechanic stress.
- Genetics – study of genes and heredity.
  - Molecular genetics – study of the bimolecular mechanisms behind the structure and function of DNA
  - Quantitative genetics – study of phenotypes that vary continuously (in characters such as height or mass)—as opposed to discretely identifiable phenotypes and gene-products (such as eye-colour, or the presence of a particular biochemical).
- Marine biology – study of ocean ecosystems, plants, animals, and other living beings.
- Microbiology – study of microscopic organisms (microorganisms) and their interactions with other living things.
  - Bacteriology – study of bacteria
  - Immunology – study of immune systems in all organisms.
  - Mycology – study of fungi
  - Parasitology – study of parasites and parasitism.
  - Virology – study of viruses
- Biochemistry
  - Molecular biology – study of biology and biological functions at the molecular level, with some cross over from biochemistry.
  - Structural biology – a branch of molecular biology, biochemistry, and biophysics concerned with the molecular structure of biological macromolecules.
- Health sciences and human biology – biology of humans.
  - Medicine – Diagnosis, treatment, and prevention of illness.
    - Endocrinology – study of the endocrine system.
    - Oncology – study of cancer processes, including virus or mutation, oncogenesis, angiogenesis, and tissues remoldings.
    - Pharmacology – study of medication and drugs
    - Epidemiology – major component of public health research, studying factors affecting the health of populations.
- Glycobiology - the study of synthesized, complex sugars (or glycans) which commonly modify other biopolymers through glycosylation
  - Glycosylation - enzymatic addition of glycans to biopolymers creating glycoconjugates
    - Glycoproteins
    - Glycolipids
    - Glycopeptides, etc.
  - Translational glycobiology - pharmacological tool of adding glycans to candidate drugs to alter their biological activity, including randomly through glycorandomization
  - Glycomics - the large-scale study of the complete glycan repertoire of a cell or organism
- Neuroscience – study of the nervous system, including anatomy, physiology and emergent properties.
  - Behavioral neuroscience – study of physiological, genetic, and developmental mechanisms of behavior in humans and other animals.
  - Cellular neuroscience – study of neurons at a cellular level.
  - Cognitive neuroscience – study of biological substrates underlying cognition, with a focus on the neural substrates of mental processes.
  - Computational neuroscience – study of the information processing functions of the nervous system, and the use of digital computers to study the nervous system.
  - Developmental neuroscience – study of the cellular basis of brain development and addresses the underlying mechanisms.
  - Molecular neuroscience – studies the biology of the nervous system with molecular biology, molecular genetics, protein chemistry and related methodologies.
  - Neuroanatomy – study of the anatomy of nervous tissue and neural structures of the nervous system.
  - Neuroendocrinology – studies the interaction between the nervous system and the endocrine system, that is how the brain regulates the hormonal activity in the body.
  - Neuroethology – study of animal behavior and its underlying mechanistic control by the nervous system.
  - Neuroimmunology – study of the nervous system, and immunology, the study of the immune system.
  - Neuropharmacology – study of how drugs affect cellular function in the nervous system.
  - Neurophysiology – study of the function (as opposed to structure) of the nervous system.
  - Systems neuroscience – studies the function of neural circuits and systems.
- Theoretical biology – the mathematical modeling of biological phenomena.
  - Systems biology – computational modeling of biological systems.
- Zoology – study of animals, including classification, physiology, development, and behavior. Subbranches include:
  - Arthropodology – biological discipline concerned with the study of arthropods, a phylum of animals that include the insects, arachnids, crustaceans and others that are characterized by the possession of jointed limbs.
    - Arachnology – scientific study of spiders and related animals such as scorpions, pseudoscorpions, harvestmen, collectively called arachnids.
      - Acarology – study of the taxon of arachnids that contains mites and ticks.
    - Entomology – study of insects.
      - Coleopterology – study of beetles.
      - Lepidopterology – study of a large order of insects that includes moths and butterflies (called lepidopterans).
      - Myrmecology – scientific study of ants.
    - Carcinology – study of crustaceans.
    - Myriapodology – study of centipedes, millipedes, and other myriapods.
  - Ethology – scientific study of animal behavior, usually with a focus on behavior under natural conditions.
  - Helminthology – study of worms, especially parasitic worms.
  - Herpetology – study of amphibians (including frogs, toads, salamanders, newts, and gymnophiona) and reptiles (including snakes, lizards, amphisbaenids, turtles, terrapins, tortoises, crocodilians, and the tuataras).
    - Batrachology – subdiscipline of herpetology concerned with the study of amphibians alone.
  - Ichthyology – study of fishes. This includes bony fishes (Osteichthyes), cartilaginous fishes (Chondrichthyes), and jawless fishes (Agnatha).
  - Malacology – branch of invertebrate zoology which deals with the study of the Mollusca (mollusks or molluscs), the second-largest phylum of animals in terms of described species after the arthropods.
    - Teuthology – branch of Malacology which deals with the study of cephalopods.
  - Mammalogy – study of mammals, a class of vertebrates with characteristics such as homeothermic metabolism, fur, four-chambered hearts, and complex nervous systems. Mammalogy has also been known as "mastology," "theriology," and "therology." There are about 4,200 different species of animals which are considered mammals.
    - Cetology – branch of marine mammal science that studies the approximately eighty species of whales, dolphins, and porpoise in the scientific order Cetacea.
    - Primatology – scientific study of primates
    - Human biology – interdisciplinary field studying the range of humans and human populations via biology/life sciences, anthropology/social sciences, applied/medical sciences
    - Biological anthropology – subfield of anthropology that studies the physical morphology, genetics and behavior of the human genus, other hominins and hominids across their evolutionary development
      - Human behavioral ecology – the study of behavioral adaptations (foraging, reproduction, ontogeny) from the evolutionary and ecologic perspectives (see behavioral ecology). It focuses on human adaptive responses (physiological, developmental, genetic) to environmental stresses.
  - Nematology – scientific discipline concerned with the study of nematodes, or roundworms.
  - Ornithology – scientific study of birds.

== Applied life science branches and derived concepts ==
- Agriculture – science and practice of cultivating plants and livestock
  - Agronomy – science of cultivating plants for resources
- Biocomputers – systems of biologically derived molecules, such as DNA and proteins, are used to perform computational calculations involving storing, retrieving, and processing data. The development of biological computing has been made possible by the expanding new science of nanobiotechnology.
- Biocontrol – bioeffector-method of controlling pests (including insects, mites, weeds and plant diseases) using other living organisms.
- Bioengineering – study of biology through the means of engineering with an emphasis on applied knowledge and especially related to biotechnology
- Bioelectronics – field at the convergence of electronics and biological sciences. The electrical state of biological matter significantly affects its structure and function, compare for instance the membrane potential, the signal transduction by neurons, the isoelectric point (IEP) and so on. Micro- and nano-electronic components and devices have increasingly been combined with biological systems like medical implants, biosensors, lab-on-a-chip devices etc. causing the emergence of this new scientific field.
- Biomaterials – any matter, surface, or construct that interacts with biological systems. As a science, biomaterials is about fifty years old. The study of biomaterials is called biomaterials science. It has experienced steady and strong growth over its history, with many companies investing large amounts of money into the development of new products. Biomaterials science encompasses elements of medicine, biology, chemistry, tissue engineering and materials science.
- Biomedical science – healthcare science, also known as biomedical science, is a set of applied sciences applying portions of natural science or formal science, or both, to develop knowledge, interventions, or technology of use in healthcare or public health. Such disciplines as medical microbiology, clinical virology, clinical epidemiology, genetic epidemiology and pathophysiology are medical sciences.
- Biomonitoring – measurement of the body burden of toxic chemical compounds, elements, or their metabolites, in biological substances. Often, these measurements are done in blood and urine.
- Biopolymer – polymers produced by living organisms; in other words, they are polymeric biomolecules. Since they are polymers, biopolymers contain monomeric units that are covalently bonded to form larger structures. There are three main classes of biopolymers, classified according to the monomeric units used and the structure of the biopolymer formed: polynucleotides (RNA and DNA), which are long polymers composed of 13 or more nucleotide monomers; polypeptides, which are short polymers of amino acids; and polysaccharides, which are often linear bonded polymeric carbohydrate structures.
- Biotechnology – manipulation of living matter, including genetic modification and synthetic biology
- Conservation biology – the management of nature and of Earth's biodiversity with the aim of protecting species, their habitats, and ecosystems from excessive rates of extinction and the erosion of biotic interactions. It is an interdisciplinary subject drawing on natural and social sciences, and the practice of natural resource management.
- Environmental health – multidisciplinary field concerned with environmental epidemiology, toxicology, and exposure science.
- Fermentation technology – study of use of microorganisms for industrial manufacturing of various products like vitamins, amino acids, antibiotics, beer, wine, etc.
- Food science – applied science devoted to the study of food. Activities of food scientists include the development of new food products, design of processes to produce and conserve these foods, choice of packaging materials, shelf-life studies, study of the effects of food on the human body, sensory evaluation of products using panels or potential consumers, as well as microbiological, physical (texture and rheology) and chemical testing.
- Genomics – application of recombinant DNA, DNA sequencing methods, and bioinformatics to sequence, assemble, and analyze the function and structure of genomes (the complete set of DNA within a single cell of an organism). The field includes efforts to determine the entire DNA sequence of organisms and fine-scale genetic mapping. The field also includes studies of intragenomic phenomena such as heterosis, epistasis, pleiotropy and other interactions between loci and alleles within the genome. In contrast, the investigation of the roles and functions of single genes is a primary focus of molecular biology or genetics and is a common topic of modern medical and biological research. Research of single genes does not fall into the definition of genomics unless the aim of this genetic, pathway, and functional information analysis is to elucidate its effect on, place in, and response to the entire genome's networks.
- Health sciences – sciences which focus on health, or health care, as core parts of their subject matter. These two subject matters relate to multiple academic disciplines, both STEM disciplines, as well as emerging patient safety disciplines (such as social care research), and are both relevant to current health science knowledge.
  - Medical devices – A medical device is an instrument, apparatus, implant, in vitro reagent, or similar or related article that is used to diagnose, prevent, or treat disease or other conditions, and does not achieve its purposes through chemical action within or on the body (which would make it a drug). Whereas medicinal products (also called pharmaceuticals) achieve their principal action by pharmacological, metabolic or immunological means, medical devices act by other means like physical, mechanical, or thermal means.
  - Medical imaging – the technique and process used to create images of the human body (or parts and function thereof) for clinical or physiological research purposes
  - Immunotherapy – the "treatment of disease by inducing, enhancing, or suppressing an immune response". Immunotherapies designed to elicit or amplify an immune response are classified as activation immunotherapies, while immunotherapies that reduce or suppress are classified as suppression immunotherapies.
- Kinesiology – scientific study of human movement. Kinesiology, also known as human kinetics, addresses physiological, mechanical, and psychological mechanisms. Applications of kinesiology to human health include: biomechanics and orthopedics; strength and conditioning; sport psychology; methods of rehabilitation, such as physical and occupational therapy; and sport and exercise. Individuals who have earned degrees in kinesiology can work in research, the fitness industry, clinical settings, and in industrial environments. Studies of human and animal motion include measures from motion tracking systems, electrophysiology of muscle and brain activity, various methods for monitoring physiological function, and other behavioral and cognitive research techniques.
  Parasagittal MRI of the head, with aliasing artifacts
- Optogenetics – a neuromodulation technique employed in neuroscience that uses a combination of techniques from optics and genetics to control and monitor the activities of individual neurons in living tissue—even within freely-moving animals—and to precisely measure the effects of those manipulations in real-time. The key reagents used in optogenetics are light-sensitive proteins. Spatially-precise neuronal control is achieved using optogenetic actuators like channelrhodopsin, halorhodopsin, and archaerhodopsin, while temporally-precise recordings can be made with the help of optogenetic sensors like Clomeleon, Mermaid, and SuperClomeleon.
- Pharmacogenomics – field of science and technology that analyses how genetic makeup affects an individual's response to drugs. Pharmacogenomics (a portmanteau of pharmacology and genomics) deals with the influence of genetic variation on drug response in patients by correlating gene expression or single-nucleotide polymorphisms with a drug's efficacy or toxicity.
- Pharmacology – branch of medicine and biology concerned with the study of drug action, where a drug can be broadly defined as any human-made, natural, or endogenous (within the body) molecule which exerts a biochemical and/or physiological effect on the cell, tissue, organ, or organism. More specifically, it is the study of the interactions that occur between a living organism and chemicals that affect normal or abnormal biochemical function. If substances have medicinal properties, they are considered pharmaceuticals.
- Proteomics – the large-scale study of proteins, particularly their structures and functions. Proteins are vital parts of living organisms, as they are the main components of the physiological metabolic pathways of cells. The proteome is the entire set of proteins, produced or modified by an organism or system. This varies with time and distinct requirements, or stresses, that a cell or organism undergoes.

== See also ==
- Outline of biology
- Divisions of pharmacology
- Control theory
