= OvaScience =

Previously publicly traded biotechnology company

OvaScience, Inc
- Type: Public
- Industry: Biotechnology, infertility treatment
- Founded: 2011
- Founder: Michelle Dipp, Richard Aldrich, Christoph Westphal, Jonathan Tilly, and David Sinclair
- Defunct: 2018
- Fate: Reverse Merger with Millendo, Therapeutics, Inc.
- Headquarters: Waltham, United States
- Website: www.ovascience.com

OvaScience was a publicly traded biotechnology company, focused on female infertility. It was founded in 2011 by Michelle Dipp, Richard Aldrich, Christoph Westphal, Jonathan Tilly, and David Sinclair and is based on scientific work done by Tilly concerning mammalian oogonial stem cells (OSCs) and work on mitochondria by Sinclair. Tilly's work was expectedly met with skepticism, as it warranted a paradigm-shift. The existence and functional potential of mammalian OSCs remains highly controversial, and the prevailing scientific consensus has not accepted Tilly's proposed paradigm shift. While some allied research groups have reported isolating OSCs using cell-sorting techniques—often relying on the DDX4 protein as a surface marker—independent reproduction of the generation of functional oocytes has been heavily contested. Independent validation studies have shown that cells isolated using these methods do not actually express DDX4 on their surface and lack true germline identity, suggesting that the initial isolation protocols were based on methodological artifacts.

== History ==
As of December 2016, the company was developing two in vitro fertilization services. One service, called "Augment", would harvest putative oogonial stem cells from a woman, extract mitochondria from those cells, and inject them into an oocyte from the woman, along with sperm, in a form of augmented intracytoplasmic sperm injection ("ICSI"). In the other, which it calls "OvaTure," it would harvest putative oogonial stem cells from a woman, mature them into oocytes in vitro, and then fertilize them with ICSI. It had introduced the Augment service in 2014 in ten clinics located in the United Arab Emirates, Canada and Japan. The company's claims about its services were controversial from their first announcements.

Dipp, Aldrich, Westphal, and Sinclair had previously worked together to found and develop Sirtris Pharmaceuticals around Sinclair's work on resveratrol — the company was sold to GlaxoSmithKline in 2008 for around $720 million and then was absorbed into GSK in 2013 after resveratrol was abandoned in 2010; Dipp, Westphal, and Aldrich were also involved in Alnara Pharmaceuticals, which was sold to Eli Lilly in 2010 for around $180 million and was also later abandoned by its purchaser when its technology failed.

== Financing ==
The company's A financing round was $6 million, financed by Longwood Fund and Bessemer Venture Partners, and it raised a $37 million B round in early 2012, funded by General Catalyst, BBT Capital Management Advisors, Cycad Group, Hunt BioVentures, RA Capital, Longwood, Bessemer, and other undisclosed investors.

OvaScience held its public offering in 2012, and part of its pitch to investors was that its services would probably not be regulated by the FDA so it would probably be able to start generating significant revenue in the US by the end of 2013, but in 2013 the FDA ruled that it would need to file an investigational new drug application before it could start marketing the service; OvaScience's shares fell 40% in response.

Its share price reached about $50 in January 2015.

By September 2016 OvaScience had raised and spent around $228 million. In early December its shares were trading at around $3; in mid-December 2016 the company's shares fell around 50% when it announced layoffs and the departure of its CEO and chief operating officer in the face of sales continuing to fall below expectations.

In 2015 venture capital companies invested $118 million in companies addressing infertility and in 2016 they invested around $100 million; along with OvaScience, other companies with significant investment included Natera, Femasys, and Progyny, Inc.

On August 9, 2018, a merger agreement was announced between OvaScience and Millendo Therapeutics, Inc., in a reverse merger transaction, where Millendo's leadership team and development pipeline would continue on post-transaction.

== See also ==
- Mitochondrial replacement therapy
