= Avutometinib =

Chemical compound

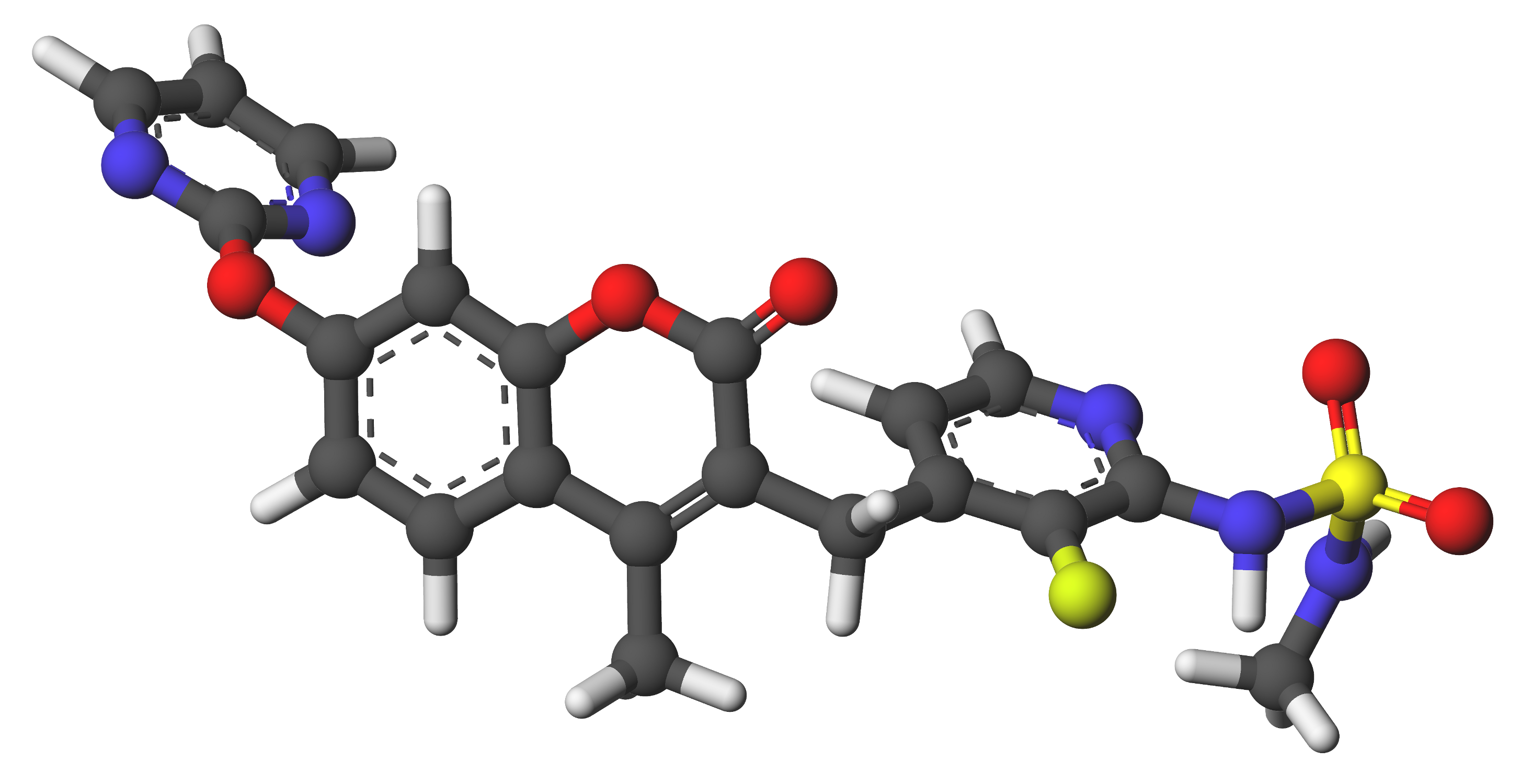
- Skeletal formula and ball-and-stick model of avutometinib

Clinical data
- Other names: RO-5126766; CH-5126766; CKI-27; R-7304; RG-7304

Pharmacokinetic data
- Elimination half-life: 60 h (45.8–93.7 h)

Identifiers
- IUPAC name: 3-[[3-fluoro-2-(methylsulfamoylamino)pyridin-4-yl]methyl]-4-methyl-7-pyrimidin-2-yloxychromen-2-one
- CAS Number: 946128-88-7
- PubChem CID: 16719221
- DrugBank: DB15254
- ChemSpider: 17623621
- UNII: D0D4252V97
- KEGG: D12515
- ChEBI: CHEBI:78825
- ChEMBL: ChEMBL3264002
- PDB ligand: CHU (PDBe, RCSB PDB)

Chemical and physical data
- Formula: C_{21}H_{18}FN_{5}O_{5}S
- Molar mass: 471.46 g·mol^{−1}
- 3D model (JSmol): Interactive image
- SMILES: CC1=C(C(=O)OC2=C1C=CC(=C2)OC3=NC=CC=N3)CC4=C(C(=NC=C4)NS(=O)(=O)NC)F
- InChI: InChI=1S/C21H18FN5O5S/c1-12-15-5-4-14(31-21-25-7-3-8-26-21)11-17(15)32-20(28)16(12)10-13-6-9-24-19(18(13)22)27-33(29,30)23-2/h3-9,11,23H,10H2,1-2H3,(H,24,27); Key:LMMJFBMMJUMSJS-UHFFFAOYSA-N

Avutometinib (INN; codenamed RO-5126766, CH-5126766, CKI-27, R-7304, RG-7304, and VS-6766 at various stages of its development) is an inhibitor of Ras-Raf-MEK-ERK signaling being developed as a potential treatment for cancer.

It was discovered by Chugai Pharmaceutical Co. (a subsidiary of Roche) through derivatization of a hit compound identified by high-throughput screening. It was licensed by Verastem Oncology in 2020 for clinical trials.

The co-packaged medication avutometinib/defactinib was approved for medical use in the United States in May 2025.
