= Aging (journal) =

- Discipline: Gerontology
- Language: English
- Edited by: Jan Vijg, David Andrew Sinclair, Vera Gorbunova, Mikhail V. Blagosklonny

Publication details
- History: 2009–present
- Publisher: Impact Journals
- Frequency: Bimonthly
- Open access: Yes
- Impact factor: 5.955 (2021)

Standard abbreviations
- ISO 4: Aging (Albany N.Y.)

Indexing
- ISSN: 1945-4589
- LCCN: 2008212863
- OCLC no.: 252820116

Links
- Journal homepage; Online access; Online archive

Aging is a bimonthly peer-reviewed open access bio-medical journal covering research on all aspects of gerontology. The journal was established in 2009 and is published by Impact Journals. The editors-in-chief are Jan Vijg, David Andrew Sinclair, Vera Gorbunova, Judith Campisi, and Mikhail V. Blagosklonny.

== Abstracting and indexing ==
The journal is abstracted and indexed in ISI/Web of Science: Science Citation Index Expanded in the categories of Cell Biology and Geriatrics & Gerontology. The journal is archived in PubMed Central (PMC) and is indexed in Index Medicus/MEDLINE, PubMed, Meta, EMBASE, BIOSIS Previews, and Scopus. According to Scopus/Scimago Journal Rank (2015), Aging is ranked number 3 on Cites/Docs (2 years) in the Aging category.

The journal has a 2021 impact factor of 5.955.

== Reception ==
The peer review process employed by the journal has been criticized by Jeffrey Beall, a university librarian and expert on predatory open access publishing, who also included the journal and its publisher on his list of "potential, possible, or probable predatory scholarly open-access journals" in July 2015. Allegedly, journal editor Mikhail Blagosklonny responded by threatening to retract the papers of Beall's colleagues at the University of Colorado. It has been alleged that the journal has gamed their impact factor by requiring authors to provide references to other recent papers in the journal and does not conduct adequate peer-reviews of articles.
