= Gosden =

Gosden is a surname. Notable people with the surname include:

- Andrew Gosden (born 1993), disappeared in London aged 14
- Chris Gosden (born 1955), British archaeologist, professor of archaeology at Oxford
- Christine Gosden (born 1939), British swimmer
- Freeman Gosden (1899–1992), American radio comedian
- John Gosden (born 1951), British racehorse trainer
- Roger Gosden (born 1948), British physiologist concerned with reproductive medicine
- Towser Gosden (1904–67), British racehorse trainer
