= David A. Sinclair =

Australian geneticist (born 1969)

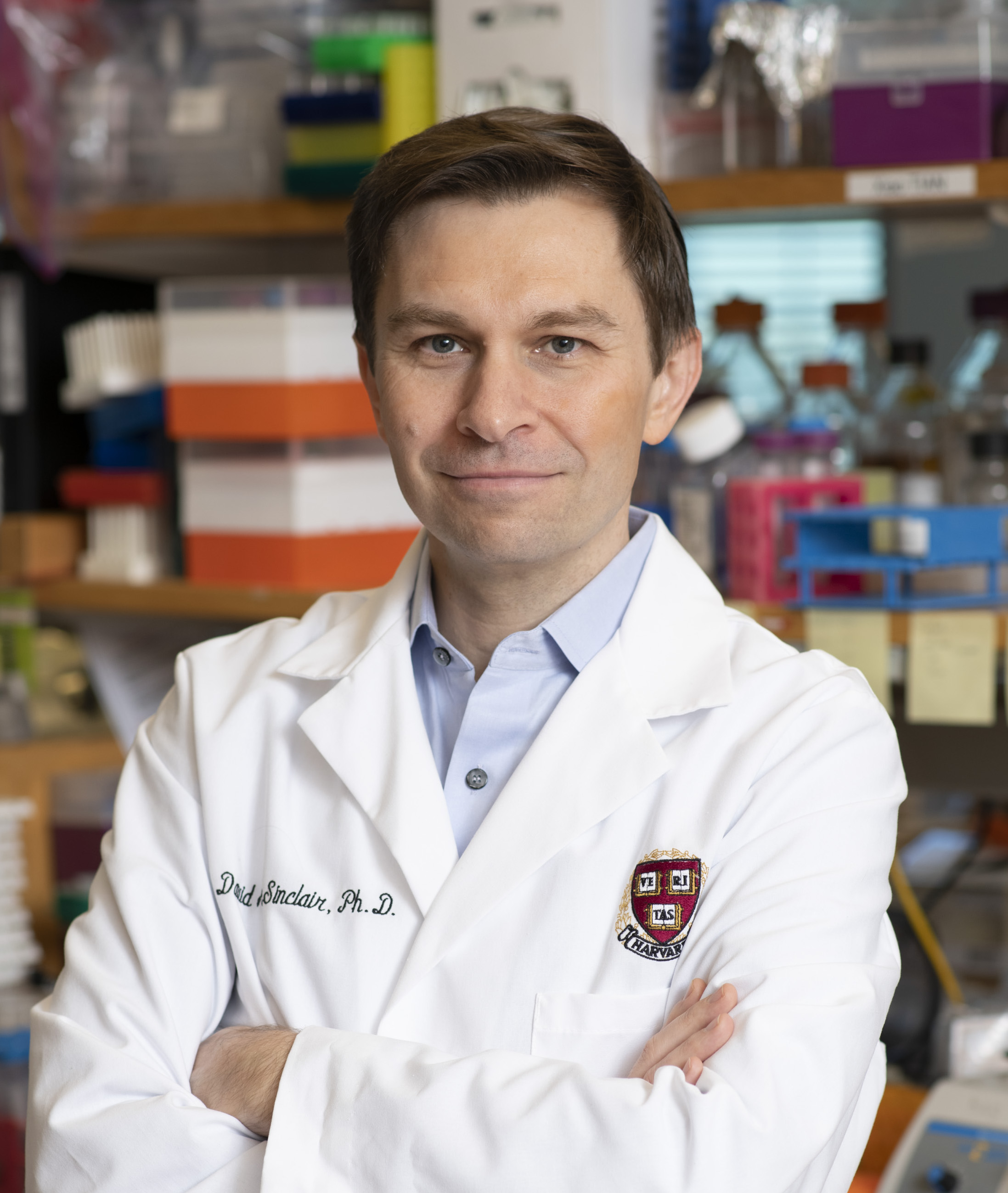
- Sinclair in 2020
- Born: 26 June 1969 (age 57); Sydney, New South Wales, Australia
- Citizenship: Australia; United States
- Education: University of New South Wales (BSc, PhD)
- Known for: Research on aging
- Awards: NIH MERIT Award (2012); The Australian Medical Research Medal (2014); NIH Director's Pioneer Award (2017)
- Scientific career
- Fields: Molecular genetics
- Workplaces: Harvard Medical School
- Doctoral advisor: Ian Dawes
- Other academic advisors: Leonard P. Guarente

David Andrew Sinclair AO (born June 26, 1969) is an Australian-American biologist and academic known for his research on aging and epigenetics. Sinclair is a professor of genetics at Harvard Medical School and the founding director of the Paul F. Glenn Laboratories for the Biological Mechanisms of Aging at Harvard. He is the co-author of Lifespan: Why We Age – and Why We Don't Have To.

== Early life and education ==
David Andrew Sinclair was born in Australia in 1969 and grew up in St Ives, New South Wales. His paternal grandmother had immigrated to Australia following the suppression of the Hungarian Uprising of 1956, and his father changed the family name from Szigeti to Sinclair. Sinclair studied at the University of New South Wales, Sydney, obtaining a bachelor of science in biochemistry in 1991 and a Ph.D. in molecular genetics in 1995, focusing on gene regulation in yeast. He also won the Australian Commonwealth Prize.

== Career ==
Sinclair met Massachusetts Institute of Technology professor Leonard P. Guarente in 1993. Guarente had studied yeast as a model of aging, and after meeting him, Sinclair interviewed for a post-doc position in Guarente's lab.

He worked as a postdoctoral researcher for Guarente for four years and in 1999 he was hired at Harvard Medical School. In 2004, Sinclair met with the philanthropist Paul F. Glenn who donated $5 million to Harvard to establish the Paul F. Glenn Laboratories for the Biological Mechanisms of Aging at Harvard, of which Sinclair became the founding director. In 2004, Sinclair founded Sirtris Pharmaceuticals along with Andrew Perlman, Christoph Westphal, Richard Aldrich, Richard Pops, and Paul Schimmel.

Sirtris was focused on developing Sinclair's research into activators of sirtuins, work that began in the Guarente lab. The company was specifically focused on resveratrol formulations and derivatives as activators of the SIRT1 enzyme; Sinclair became known for making statements about resveratrol like: "(It's) as close to a miraculous molecule as you can find. ... One hundred years from now, people may be taking these molecules on a daily basis to prevent heart disease, stroke, and cancer." Most of the anti-aging field was more cautious, especially with regard to what else resveratrol might do in the body and its lack of bioavailability. The company went public in 2007 and was subsequently purchased by and made a subsidiary of GlaxoSmithKline in 2008 for $720 million. Five years later, GSK shuttered the Sirtris program without successful drug development.

In 2006, Sinclair co-founded Genocea Biosciences, a company founded based on the work of Harvard scientist Darren E. Higgins around antigens that stimulate T cells and the use of these antigens to create vaccines; The company delisted from the NASDAQ and closed in 2022 due to lack of funding.

In 2008, Sinclair was promoted to tenured professor at Harvard Medical School. A few years later, he also became a conjoint professor at the School of Medical Sciences at the University of New South Wales. In 2008, he also joined the scientific advisory board of Shaklee and helped them devise and introduce a product containing resveratrol called "Vivix". He later disputed the use of his name and words to promote the supplement, and resigned from the board.

In 2011, Sinclair co-founded OvaScience along with Michelle Dipp, Aldrich, Westphal, and Jonathan Tilly. The company was based on scientific work done by Tilly concerning mammalian oogonial stem cells and work on mitochondria by Sinclair. The company merged with Millendo Therapeutics in 2018. In 2011, he also co-founded CohBar along with Nir Barzilai and other colleagues. CohBar aimed to discover and develop novel peptides derived from mitochondria. CohBar delisted from the NASDAQ upon belief that it was a public shell.

In 2015, he co-founded Metro Biotech along with Washington University in St. Louis professor Dr. Rajendra Apte. The pharmaceutical company focused on NAD+ precursors such as NMN. He also co-founded Animal Bioscience in 2017 along with his brother Nick. The company focuses on small molecule-based therapy for the pet industry. In the same year he founded Life Biosciences to develop gene therapies aimed at age-related disease.

In 2022, Metro Biotech successfully urged the FDA to take actions to take NMN off the market as a supplement because Metro Biotech had registered NMN in investigational new drug applications. The following year, he co-founded Tally Health, a supplement company with a stated goal to "change the way we age" at the cellular level.

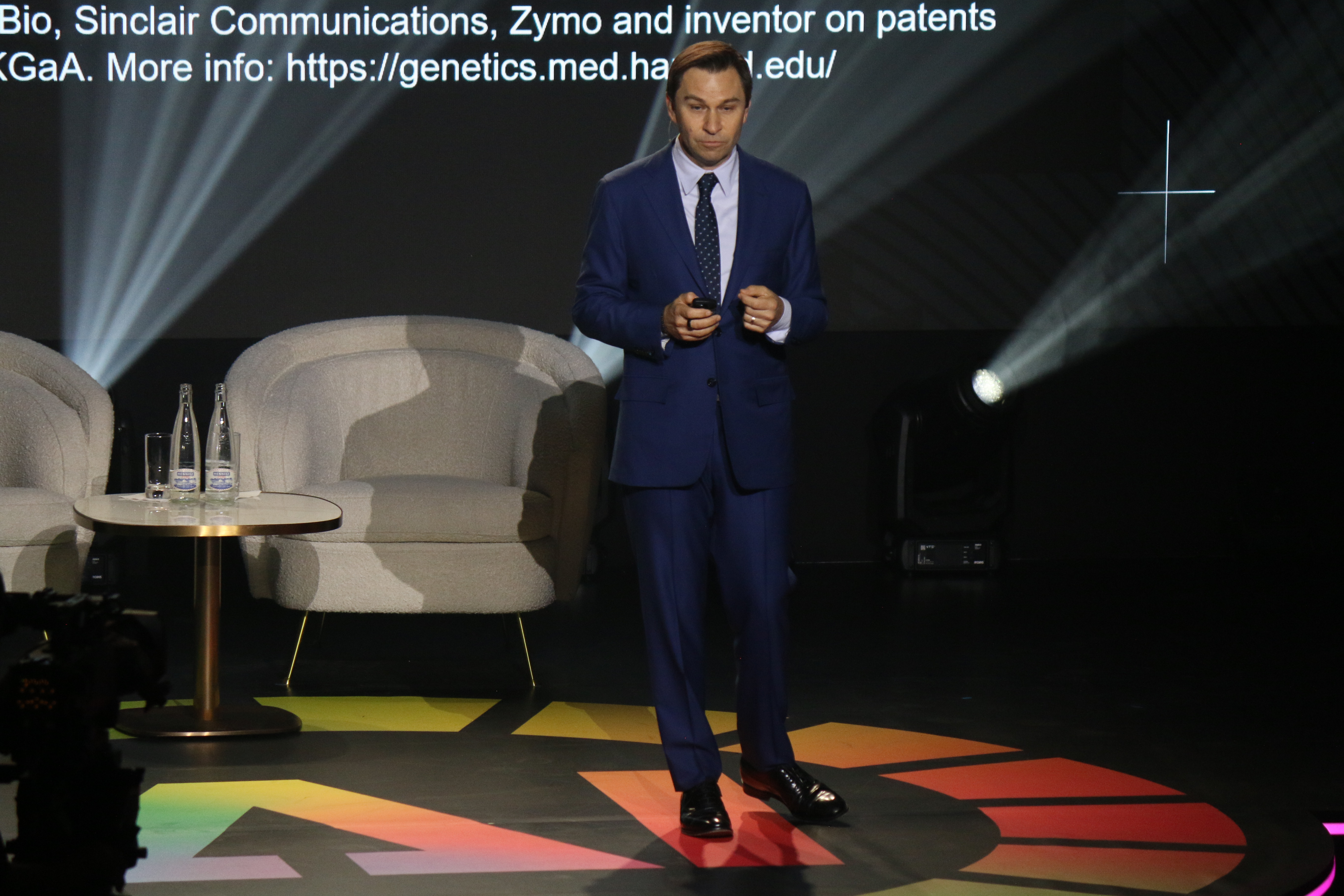
Sinclair at the 2025 AI for Good Summit in Geneva

In 2024, Sinclair resigned as the President of The Academy for Health and Lifespan Research, an organization made up of a group of scientists that Sinclair had co-founded. The resignation came after what The Wall Street Journal described as a "cascade" of resignations from outraged members of The Academy after Sinclair and his brother announced that Animal Bioscience had proven that a supplement for dogs with undisclosed ingredients reversed aging. The claim was also met with criticism and skepticism from other longevity researchers.

== Research ==
Sinclair has expressed the view that there is no limit to human lifespan, and that there is a backup copy of the genetic and epigenetic information in us.

While Sinclair was in Guarente's lab, he discovered that sirtuin 1 (called sir2 in yeast) slows aging in yeast by reducing the accumulation of extrachromosomal rDNA circles. Others working in the lab at the time identified NAD as an essential cofactor for sirtuin function. In 2002, after he had left for Harvard, he clashed with Guarente at a scientific meeting at Cold Spring Harbor Laboratory, challenging Guarente's description of how sir2 might be involved in aging; this set off a scientific rivalry.

In 2003, Sinclair learned that scientists at a Pennsylvania biotech company called Biomol Research Laboratories had developed a biochemical assays in which they thought that polyphenols including resveratrol activated SIR2. This led to publications authored in part by Sinclair in both Nature and Science in 2003. However, by 2005, it became clear that the biochemical assay consists of a fluorescent probe that interacts nonspecifically with resveratrol and that resveratrol is not a SIR2 activator Despite the scientific debunking of resveratrol, Sinclair maintains an outspoken advocacy for resveratrol as an anti-aging drug and supplement. High-profile papers claiming age reversal of mice have also come under intense scrutiny. Sinclair's lab has continued to work on resveratrol and analogues of it as part of their research program in anti-aging.

In December, 2020, Sinclair's group published that three Yamanaka transcription factors, Oct4, Sox2, and Klf4, when delivered together in a virus, could safely reverse the age of human and mouse cells, and restore the vision of old mice and mice with glaucoma. In 2023, with Bruce Ksander's lab at Mass Eye and Ear, they presented a poster at the annual ARVO conference accompanied by a company press release claiming that vision could be restored in non-human primates.

In January 2023, Sinclair's lab published research in Cell purporting to support his Information Theory of Aging, the idea that mammalian aging is due to the loss of epigenetic information, and that Yamanaka factors could exert a degree of artificial control over senescence and rejuvenation in mice. The paper received a formal reply pointing out that the treatment used in the paper is known to produce p53-dependent cell death in a 30-day period in which the mice were not observed. Sinclair's claims of reverse aging have received criticism from other scientists.

== Bibliography ==
=== Books ===
In September 2019, Sinclair published Lifespan: Why We Age – and Why We Don't Have To co-written with journalist Matthew LaPlante and translated into 18 languages. This was also released as an audiobook on Audible and read by Sinclair. Sinclair broadly discusses his longevity practices on social media and includes them in his book. They include daily doses of nicotinamide mononucleotide (NMN) and resveratrol, which Sinclair claims are activators of SIRT1.

=== Selected publications ===
- 2023, The Information Theory of Aging, Nature Aging
- 2023, Chemically induced reprogramming to reverse cellular aging, Aging
- 2023, Loss of epigenetic information as a cause of mammalian aging, Cell
- 2021, The economic value of targeting aging, Nature Aging
- 2020, Reprogramming to recover youthful epigenetic information and restore vision, Nature
- 2008, SIRT1 redistribution on chromatin promotes genomic stability but alters gene expression during aging, Cell
