= GeneMatrix =

GeneMatrix Inc
- Company type: Public
- Industry: Biotechnology
- Headquarters: Yong-in, South Korea
- Revenue: KRW 3,543 million (2009)
- Net income: KRW 1,666 million (2009)
- Total assets: KRW 13,906 million (2009)
- Website: www.genematrix.net/eng

GeneMatrix Inc is a South Korean company servicing molecular diagnostics. The company is listed on KOSDAQ:109820. Its main service is to diagnose DNA mutations based on its proprietary technology of restriction fragment mass polymorphism (RFMP). It is affiliated with the Seoul National University Medical Center, the largest oncology center in Korea.

== History ==
GeneMatrix Inc was founded in 2000 by former employees of CJ Cheil Jedang, one of South Korea's largest conglomerates.

In 2001, VARIAGENICS, INC.(Nasdaq: VGNX)who was a leader in pharmacogenomics, entered into a research and development collaboration with GeneMatrix Inc which had been applying genomic technology to the development of drugs and diagnostics to treat cancer. The ultimate goal was to develop molecular diagnostic products that would predict the body's response to leading drugs in the treatment of colon and gastric cancer. WangDon Yoo, CEO and President of GeneMatrix chose VARIAGENICS as a collaborative partner because, "they have the best platform and expertise in applying pharmacogenomics to all phases of drug and diagnostic development from discovery to commercialization."

December 2002, a multi-year contract agreement with IMPATH, a leading source of cancer information and analysis, was established to provide laboratory services for patients in South Korea. GeneMatrix CEO and President, Wangdon Yoo, said the choice to collaborate "was based upon our recognition of IMPATH's leading position in anatomic pathology. IMPATH's expertise as well as its comprehensive service offerings will significantly enhance the ability of local physicians to assess treatment alternatives for cancer patients in our country.".

== Research Studies ==
One of GeneMatrix long, ongoing studies is that of Rapid Genotyping of Human Papillomavirus by Desorption Electrospray Ionization Mass Spectrometry (DESI-MS). The study is a new approach to detecting HPV DNA more rapidly using DESI-MS without sample preparation such as extraction or purification, to diagnose cervical cancer. By utilizing ambient ionization mass spectrometry to detect oligonucleotides from restriction fragment mass polymorphism (RFMP) assay, and is used in identifying which HPV genotype from different combinations of multiply charged ions of oligonucleotides. "The spray solvent system operates at the stage of washing a complex mixture of polymerase chain reaction (PCR) products, so that the oligonucleotides can be detected without sample treatment."

== Patents ==
Patent Application Number 14/353240: Patent Publication Number 20140308377 - Composition for the treatment and prevention of obesity, containing the active ingredient wheatgrass extract. "The invention was developed by Lee Young-Mi, Kim Dae-Ki and Lee Sun-Hee."
