= Defactinib =

Pharmaceutical

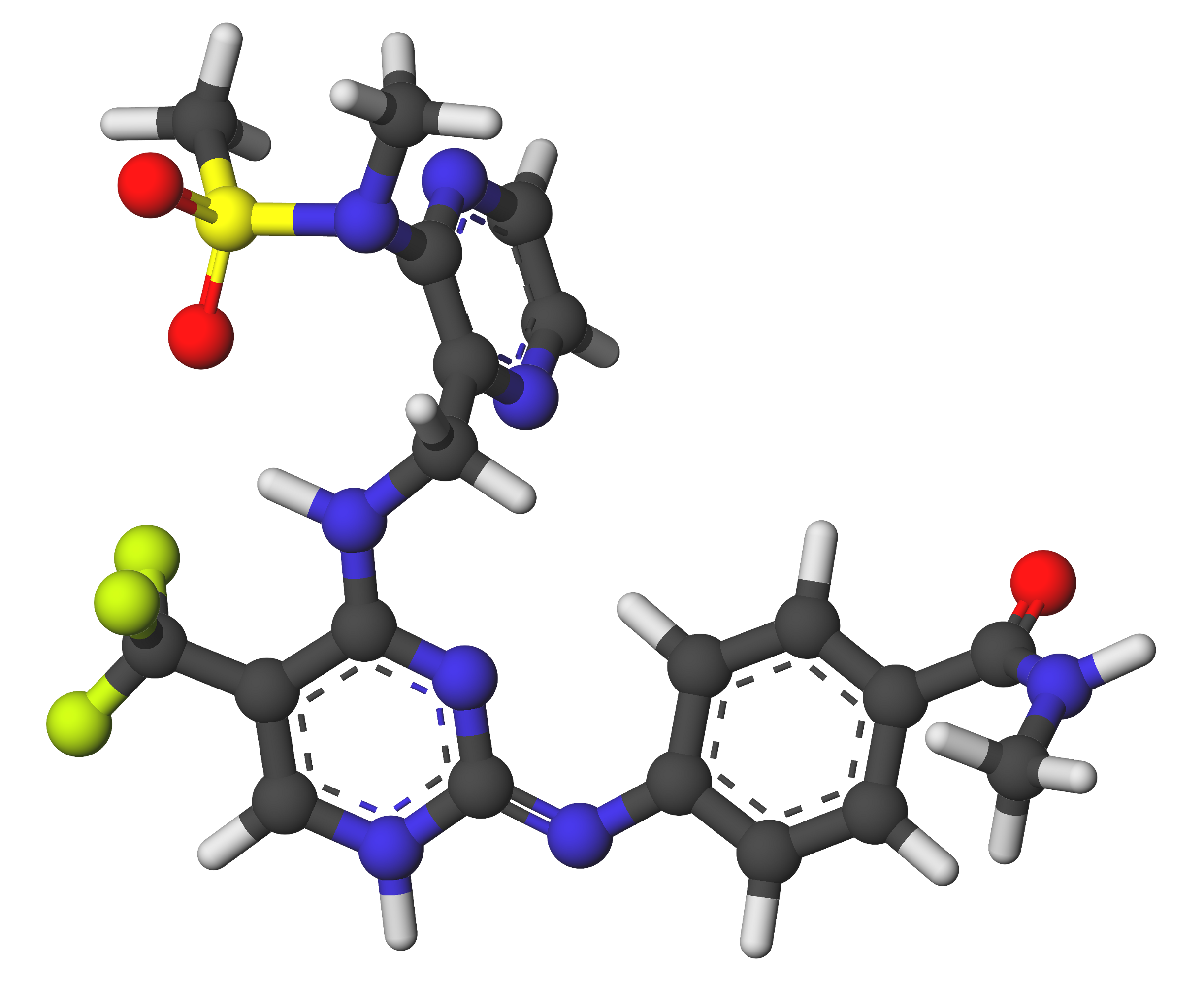
- Skeletal formula and ball-and-stick model of defactinib

Clinical data
- Other names: PF-04554878, VS-6063

Identifiers
- IUPAC name: N-methyl-4-[[4-[[3-[methyl(methylsulfonyl)amino]pyrazin-2-yl]methylamino]-5-(trifluoromethyl)pyrimidin-2-yl]amino]benzamide
- CAS Number: 1073154-85-4
- PubChem CID: 25117126
- DrugBank: DB12282
- ChemSpider: 32695161
- UNII: 53O87HA2QU
- KEGG: D10618
- ChEMBL: ChEMBL3137331
- PDB ligand: 7KD (PDBe, RCSB PDB)
- CompTox Dashboard (EPA): DTXSID901025937

Chemical and physical data
- Formula: C_{20}H_{21}F_{3}N_{8}O_{3}S
- Molar mass: 510.50 g·mol^{−1}
- 3D model (JSmol): Interactive image
- SMILES: CNC(=O)C1=CC=C(C=C1)NC2=NC=C(C(=N2)NCC3=NC=CN=C3N(C)S(=O)(=O)C)C(F)(F)F
- InChI: InChI=1S/C20H21F3N8O3S/c1-24-18(32)12-4-6-13(7-5-12)29-19-28-10-14(20(21,22)23)16(30-19)27-11-15-17(26-9-8-25-15)31(2)35(3,33)34/h4-10H,11H2,1-3H3,(H,24,32)(H2,27,28,29,30); Key:FWLMVFUGMHIOAA-UHFFFAOYSA-N

Defactinib (INN, codenamed VS-6063) is an inhibitor of PTK2, also known as focal adhesion kinase (FAK), Pyk2, and MELK which was developed by Pfizer and licensed to Verastem Oncology as a potential treatment for solid tumors.

Development for mesothelioma was discontinued in 2015 due to lack of efficacy in a placebo-controlled phase II trial. Subsequent research in patients with specific NF2 mutations also found limited activity.

The co-packaged medication avutometinib/defactinib was approved for medical use in the United States in May 2025.
