= Roger Gosden =

British-American physiologist

Roger Gordon Gosden
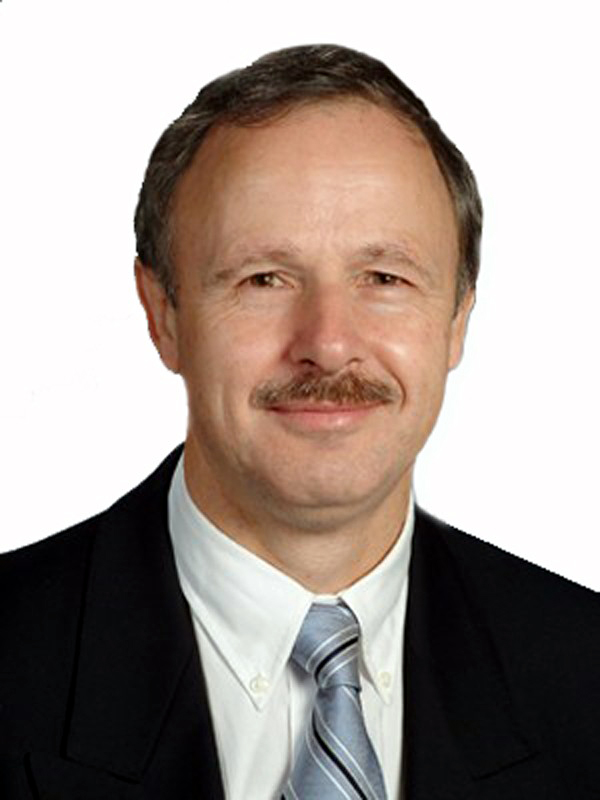
- Born: 23 September 1948 (age 77); Ryde, Isle of Wight
- Education: University of Bristol; University of Cambridge; University of Edinburgh
- Spouse: Lucinda Veeck Gosden
- Scientific career
- Fields: Physiology; Reproductive medicine
- Workplaces: University of Cambridge; Duke University; Edinburgh Medical School; Leeds School of Medicine; McGill University Health Centre; Eastern Virginia Medical School; Weill Cornell Medical School; College of William & Mary
- Theses: Reproductive senescence in female rodents (PhD 1974); Experimental and cytological studies of mammalian fertility and infertility with particular reference to the ageing ovary (DSc 1989)
- Doctoral advisor: Robert Edwards

Roger Gordon Gosden (born 23 September 1948) is a British-American physiologist in the field of female reproductive medicine. His scientific research focused on understanding the basic biology of development and senescence of ovaries in women, including mathematically modeling those processes. He did important translational research on ovarian tissue cryopreservation and transplantation.

== Early life and education ==
Gosden was born on 23 September 1948 at Ryde on the Isle of Wight, the son of Gordon Gosden and Peggy Gosden, née Butcher. He went to Chislehurst and Sidcup Grammar School in Sidcup, Kent, and then took a BSc from the University of Bristol in 1970. He did post-graduate work under Robert Edwards at Darwin College, Cambridge, where he graduated PhD in 1974 with a thesis on Reproductive senescence in female rodents.

== Scientific career ==
Gosden was a lecturer in physiology at the University of Edinburgh Medical School from 1976 to 1994, a professor of reproductive sciences at Leeds School of Medicine from 1994 to 1999, and scientific director of reproductive biology at McGill University Health Centre from 1999 to 2001. His departure from the UK was the hook for an article in The Independent about a wave of scientists emigrating from the UK due to negative public opinion about scientists in the UK. In 2001, Gosden became the director of scientific research at the Jones Institute for Reproductive Medicine at Eastern Virginia Medical School, where he was named the Howard & Georgeanna Professor of Reproductive Medicine. He left the Jones Institute in 2004 to become research director of reproductive biology at Weill Cornell Medicine, where his wife was on the faculty; part of the reason why Gosden left the institute was negative public opinion and criticism due to its creation in 2001 of an embryonic stem cell line, as was noted in a report in the journal, Science. He retired from research in 2010.

Gosden's research was focused on understanding, forecasting and treating infertility. His work focused on understanding basic biology around development and senescence of ovarian follicles and ovaries in women, including trying to mathematically model those processes, and he did important translational research on ovarian tissue cryopreservation and on ovary transplantation; his interests also extended to uterus transplantation. In 1994, Gosden and colleagues announced that they had successfully restored fertility to and achieved two live births in sheep through ovarian tissue autotransplantation, one of which had been frozen then thawed. In collaboration with Sherman Silber, this technique was later extended to women using tissue or the entire ovary transplanted from an identical twin. As of December 2016, there had been 86 live-births and were 9 on-going pregnancies directly as a result of these types of ovarian tissue transplantation.

Gosden was a scientific advisor to Celmatix, Inc., which was founded by his former student. He spoke out against the controversial claims made by OvaScience, a company founded in 2012, that it could help older women conceive using putative oogonial stem cells.

== Personal life ==
Gosden married Carole Ann Walsh in 1971 and they had two sons before their divorce in 2003. In 2004 he married Lucinda Veeck, whom he had met at the Jones Institute in Norfolk when she was working there. In the same year he moved to New York to work at Weill Cornell Medicine, where Veeck was director of clinical embryology.

In 2010, they both moved to Williamsburg, Virginia, where they run an independent publishing company, Jamestowne Bookworks, which Gosden opened as outlet for his own works, to allow him to control his own works after a life of assigning copyright to biomedical publishers, and to publish other people's work that interested him.

== Honours and lectures ==
- Amoroso Lecture (2000) - Society for Reproduction and Fertility
- Distinguished Scientist Lecture (2001) - American Society for Reproductive Medicine
- The Patrick Steptoe Memorial Lecture (2003) - British Fertility Society, Aberdeen
- Honorary Fellow (2011) - British Fertility Society
- Festschrift to honour Roger Gosden (2011) - XVth Development and Function of Reproductive Organs International Conference
- Honorary Lifetime Board Member - International Society for Fertility Preservation

== Books ==
- Biology of menopause: the causes and consequences of ovarian ageing. Academic Press, 1985. ISBN 978-0-12-291850-6
- (with Yves Aubard) Transplantation of Ovarian and Testicular Tissues. Chapman & Hall, 1996. ISBN 978-0-412-10531-9
- Cheating Time. W. H. Freeman, 1999. ISBN 978-0-7167-3648-6
- Designing Babies: The Brave New World of Reproductive Technology, 2000. W.H. Freeman. ISBN 978-0-7167-4168-8
- (with S.L. Tan) The Cryobiology of Assisted Reproduction: Gametes and Gonads. Seminars in reproductive medicine. Thieme, 2002. ISSN 1526-8004
- (with Alan Trounson) Biology and Pathology of the Oocyte: Its Role in Fertility and Reproductive Medicine. Cambridge University Press, 2003. ISBN 978-0-521-79958-4
- (with Togas Tulandi) Preservation of Fertility. Taylor & Francis, 2004. ISBN 978-1-84214-242-4
- (with Alan Trounson and Ursula Eichenlaub-Ritter) Biology and Pathology of the Oocyte: Role in Fertility, Medicine and Nuclear Reprogramming. Cambridge University Press, 2013. ISBN 978-1-107-02190-7
