= Lifespan: Why We Age – and Why We Don't Have To =

2019 non-fiction book by David Sinclair and Matthew LaPlante

- First edition (UK)
- Author: David A. Sinclair
- Language: English
- Subject: Genetics
- Genre: Non-fiction
- Publisher: Atria Books (US); Thorsons (UK)
- Publication date: September 10, 2019
- Publication place: United States
- Media type: Hardback, paperback, audiobook
- Pages: 310
- ISBN: 978-1-5011-9197-8
- OCLC: 1088652276
- Dewey Decimal: 612.67
- LC Class: QH528.5 .s56 2019

Lifespan: Why We Age – and Why We Don't Have To is a book by David A. Sinclair.

== Synopsis ==
Lifespan has three parts:

- "Part I: What We Know (The Past)" – contains 3 chapters
- "Part II: What We're Learning (The Present)" – contains 4 chapters
- "Part III: Where We're Going (The Future)" – contains 2 chapters

The book also contains an introduction and conclusion.

The authors begin by seeking to characterize how professionals view the hallmarks of aging, including genomic instability caused by DNA damage; alterations to the epigenome that controls which genes are turned on and off; loss of healthy protein maintenance, known as proteostasis; exhaustion of stem cells; and the production of inflammatory molecules.

"Address one of these, and you can slow down aging," the authors argue. "Address all of them, and you might not age."

== Critical reception ==
Lifespan debuted at #11 on The New York Times hardcover nonfiction bestseller list on September 28, 2019.

The book received mixed reviews from critics. "If you're even mildly hopeful about dunking a basketball at the age of 50, or hiking the Appalachian Trail at 70, or blowing 100 candles out on your birthday cake someday, you might consider making room for Lifespan on your bookshelf," one reviewer wrote for Outside.

A review for Boston Magazine called Sinclair "one of science's most controversial figures" and said many in the scientific community were skeptical of claims he made about human longevity. University of Alabama biology professor Steven N. Austad said, "David is a good friend, but I do think he's been guilty of making excessive claims." Writing in Archives of Gerontology and Geriatrics, Charles Brenner summarized that Lifespan has "become an influential source of misinformation on longevity, featuring counterfactual claims about longevity genes being conserved between yeast and humans, the existence of supposed activators of these genes, and claimed successful age reversal in mice based on partial reprogramming."

In a 2019 interview, Sinclair dismissed the idea that longer lifespans could lead to overpopulation. "Population growth will level off within the next couple of decades, and healthier people are having fewer children," Sinclair said. "The global population is already stabilizing, and in many advanced countries going down, so people's fear that the world will be overpopulated with frail old people is completely wrong."
