= Verastem Oncology =

Verastem, Inc.
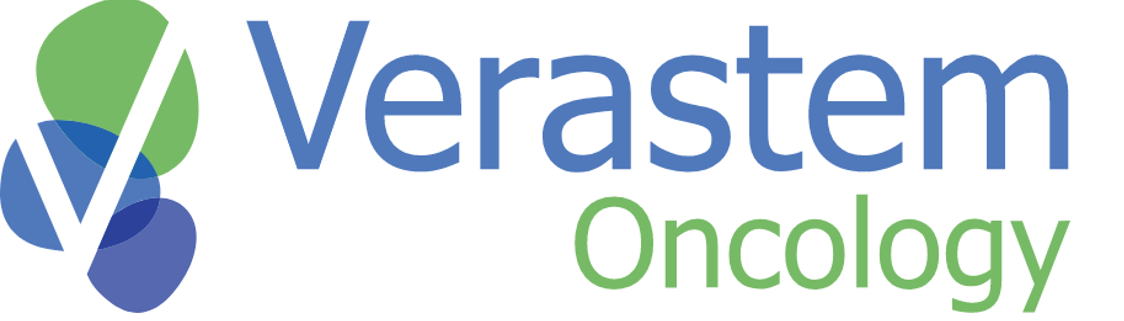
- Trade name: Verastem Oncology
- Type: Public
- Traded as: Nasdaq: VSTM; NASDAQ Biotechnology Index
- Industry: Pharmaceutical Industry
- Founded: 2010; 16 years ago
- Headquarters: Needham, Massachusetts, United States
- Key people: Brian Stuglik (CEO); Dan Paterson (COO); Jonathan Pachter Ph.D. (CSO)
- Products: Pharmaceuticals
- Number of employees: 100-200
- Website: verastem.com

Verastem, Inc., doing business as Verastem Oncology, is an American pharmaceutical company that develops medicines to treat certain cancers. Headquartered and founded in Boston, Massachusetts, the firm is a member of NASDAQ Biotechnology Index.

== History ==
Verastem Oncology (Verastem Inc) was co-founded in 2010 by entrepreneur Christoph H. Westphal and venture capitalist Michelle Dipp, who provided seed funding and initial office space in Cambridge, MA. The company was formed to commercialize the work of the three other co-founders, MIT biologists Robert Weinberg, Eric S. Lander and Piyush Gupta, by discovering and developing drugs to treat cancer by targeting cancer stem cells.

The company raised $16 million in the initial Series A financing.

Westphal served as CEO and chairman of the board from 2010 to 2013. Under his leadership, the company raised $55 million through an IPO in 2012. Mr. Robert Forrester succeeded Christoph Westphal as Verastem's president and CEO in 2013. In July 2019, Brian Stuglik was appointed to chief executive officer (CEO) of Verastem Oncology.

== Pipeline ==
Their leading investigational drug is defactinib (VS-6063), is a small-molecule focal adhesion kinase (FAK) inhibitor designed to kill cancer stem cells, intended for the treatment of malignant pleural mesothelioma. In October 2015, they announced the premature termination of the company's late-stage clinical trial for defactinib after data analysis of the Phase II COMMAND trial found no significant differences in efficacy versus placebo. . Following the failure of the study, the company had to cut 50% of its workforce.

In November 2016, Verastem Oncology licensed global rights from Infinity Pharmaceuticals to duvelisib (IPI-145), a novel inhibitor of PI3K delta and gamma. In April 2018, Verastem filed a New Drug Application (NDA) for duvelisib for the treatment of relapsed or refractory chronic lymphocytic leukemia/small lymphocytic lymphoma (CLL/SLL) and accelerated approval for relapsed or refractory follicular lymphoma (FL). The results of the clinical study DUO were published in Blood Journal.

Verastem Oncology received FDA approval for duvelisib on September 24, 2018, as a treatment for adults with 3rd-line chronic lymphocytic leukemia/small lymphocytic lymphoma, and an accelerated approval as a 3rd-line treatment for follicular lymphoma, contingent on the results of a confirmatory trial. The drug label carries a black box warning due to the risk of potentially fatal or serious toxicities: infections, diarrhea or colitis, cutaneous reactions and pneumonitis.

In July 2019, Verastem Oncology signed an exclusive agreement with Sanofi for the commercialization of duvelisib in Russia and CIS, Turkey, the Middle East and Africa.
