= Oncotarget =

- Discipline: Oncology
- Language: English
- Edited by: Mikhail Blagosklonny, Andrei V. Gudkov

Publication details
- History: 2010–present
- Publisher: Impact Journals
- Frequency: Continuous Publication
- Open access: Yes
- License: Creative Commons Attribution 3.0 License

Standard abbreviations
- ISO 4: Oncotarget

Indexing
- ISSN: 1949-2553
- OCLC no.: 408119940

Links
- Journal homepage; Online archive

Oncotarget is a primarily oncology-focused, peer-reviewed, open access journal. The journal was established in 2010 and is published by Impact Journals. The editors-in-chief are Mikhail Blagosklonny and Andrei V. Gudkov.

== Abstracting and indexing ==
The journal is abstracted and indexed in Index Medicus/MEDLINE/PubMed and Scopus. In 2022, it was re-indexed by Index Medicus/MEDLINE after being dropped in 2017. In 2018 Clarivate delisted the journal from the Journal Citation Reports and all of its other products because "the journal no longer meets the standards necessary for continued coverage", despite having listed the journal as a "Rising Star from Essential Science Indicators" only a few months prior.

== Reception ==
The peer review process employed by the journal has been criticized by Jeffrey Beall, a university librarian and expert on predatory open access publishing, who also included the journal on his list of "potential, possible, or probable predatory scholarly open-access journals" in July 2015. Allegedly, journal editor Mikhail Blagosklonny responded by threatening to retract the papers of Beall's colleagues at the University of Colorado.
