= Mikhail Blagosklonny =

American academic

- Died: October 2024
- Education: First Pavlov State Medical University of St. Peterburg
- Scientific career
- Fields: Anti-aging medicine, oncology
- Workplaces: New York Medical College; Roswell Park Comprehensive Cancer Center

Mikhail Blagosklonny was a scientist who studied cancer and aging. He died in October 2024. He was an adjunct faculty member at Roswell Park Comprehensive Cancer Center in Buffalo, New York.

== Career ==
Blagosklonny earned both his M.D. in internal medicine and his PhD in experimental medicine and cardiology from the First Pavlov State Medical University of St. Petersburg. He was appointed associate professor of medicine at New York Medical College, Valhalla, NY in 2002 before taking a position as a senior scientist at Ordway Research Institute (Albany, New York). Blagosklonny held this position until 2009, when he was appointed professor of oncology at Roswell Park Comprehensive Cancer Center.

Blagosklonny's research interests include cancer and targeted cancer therapies that protect normal cells from damage, as well as the underlying mechanisms of aging (biogerontology) and anti-aging drugs. Roswell Park Comprehensive Cancer Center lists Blagosklonny as holding "Adjunct Faculty" and "Cell Stress Biology" positions with them.

== Rapamycin and aging ==
Blagosklonny has formulated a hypothesis about the possible role of TOR signaling in aging and cancer and proposed using rapamycin, a popular cancer drug as a possible treatment for life extension. He advocated for rapamycin use in longevity research.

== Editorial activities ==
Blagosklonny was editor-in-chief of Aging, Cell Cycle, and Oncotarget. In addition, he was associate editor of Cancer Biology & Therapy and a member of the editorial board of Cell Death & Differentiation.

The peer review process employed by Oncotarget has been criticized by Jeffrey Beall, a university librarian and expert on predatory open access publishing, who also included Oncotarget and Aging on his list of "potential, possible, or probable predatory scholarly open-access journals" in July 2015. Further reports on Beall's blog suggest that the substandard peer review processes for these journals are used by their respective editors-in-chief to entice prospective authors to include references to Blagosklonny's own publications in their articles (following the peer review), thereby raising his personal citation impact.

== Health ==
Blagosklonny announced that in January 2023 he was diagnosed with numerous metastases of lung cancer in his brain. He died in October 2024 at the age of 63.
