= Robert Kane Pappas =

American filmmaker

Robert Kane Pappas is an American filmmaker who has written and directed feature films including Now I Know (Lifetime Television) and Some Fish Can Fly.

Pappas has also written and directed To Age or Not to Age, The Computer Moment (featuring William H. Macy) and received a Parents Choice Award for his children's videos. Pappas also wrote, directed, filmed and edited the mass media-critiquing Orwell Rolls in His Grave a documentary about media.

Pappas was born in New York City and has worked at Georgetown University and New York University's Tisch School of the Arts.
