= Restriction fragment mass polymorphism =

Restriction Fragment Mass Polymorphism (RFMP) is a technology which digests DNA into oligonucleotide fragments, and detects variation of DNA sequences by molecular weight of the fragments. RFMP is a proprietary technology of GeneMatrix and can be utilized for genotyping viruses and microorganisms, and for human genome research. It is relatively restricted in usage due to the existence of many other genotyping products.

== Overview ==
Restriction fragment mass polymorphism (RFMP) is an application of matrix-assisted laser desorption ionization time-of-flight (MALDI-TOF), used for identifying individual nucleotides from a DNA fragment, most commonly used in labeling single nucleotide polymorphisms (SNP). RFMP was developed as a successor to the similar restriction fragment length polymorphism (RFLP) with the intent to allow for more SNPs. Rather than read out lengths of fragments as RFLP does, the individual nucleotides are read out using MALDI-TOF, which gives specific clarity over same-length site cutting.

== Methodology ==
Like RFLP, the basic mechanism for RFMP is to run polymerase chain reaction (PCR) over a test sample. Modified PCR primers are used to create known restriction sites for enzymatic digestion. From the known fragment lengths, then, selection by length size can filter out DNA of interest. Finally, MALDI-TOF is run on the fragments of interest to produce a m/z (mass-to-charge ratio) identification spectra of the individual nucleotides.

A specific process, for example, would be Hong's 2008 strategy, outlined as the following:

- Primers are modified with a GGATG recognition site and amplified with PCR.
- The Fok-I enzyme is used to cut 9 (3’) and 13 (5’) bases upstream of the recognition site, leaving an overhang. BstF5I similarly cuts upstream at distances 2 (3’) and 0 (3’), making an additional overhang.
  - (This produces two oligonucleotide strands – a 7-mer and a 13-mer.)
- Strands of either length are put under MALDI-TOF mass spectroscopy, to determine the individual nucleotides.

These steps, like any experimental methodology, are case-specific, and can vary between experimental setup's goals and/or constraints.

== Application ==
RFMP is still primarily limited to South Korean medical literature, as it is an array assay that competes with many other specialized detection systems (whereas RFMP serves as a more general functionality).

There has been focus for RFMP to be used in HPV detection in recent years. This is motivated by fact that it has a sensitivity two log_{10}-fold better than standard of care. However, this still does not put RFMP as the clear top choice in the HPV landscape as there are others such as the Roche Linear Array, Abbot Realtime genotype II, and Sysmex HISCL HCV Gr that experimentally outperform RFMP in terms of detection accuracy.

Other limitations that hinder RFMP's spread in the medical world are attributed to its lack of information on SNP mutation rate (e.g. masses have no correspondence to mutagenesis), as well as a general increase in user-handling difficulty compared to its peers.

== See also ==
- Restriction Fragment Length Polymorphism
