= Orwell Rolls in His Grave =

- film poster
- Directed by: Robert Kane Pappas
- Written by: Robert Kane Pappas; Tom Blackburn
- Produced by: Robert Kane Pappas; Miriam Foley
- Starring: Charles Lewis; Robert McChesney; Mark Crispin Miller; Bernie Sanders; Danny Schechter
- Cinematography: J. Alan Hostetter; Robert Kane Pappas
- Edited by: Robert Kane Pappas
- Music by: Eric Wood; Paul Chapin; Extra Virgin Mary; Chris Jagich
- Production company: Sag Harbor-Basement Pictures
- Distributed by: Sag Harbor-Basement Pictures (2005); Slamdance (2011)
- Release dates: October 23, 2003 (East Hampton Film Festival); July 23, 2004 (New York City); April 13, 2005 (BAFICI, Argentina)
- Running time: 84 minutes
- Country: United States
- Language: English

Orwell Rolls in His Grave is a 2003 American documentary film directed by Robert Kane Pappas and written by Pappas and Tom Blackburn.

== Documentary topic ==
The film covered topics including the Telecommunications Act of 1996, concentration of media ownership, political corruption, Federal Communications Commission (FCC), the controversy over the 2000 US presidential election (particularly in Florida with Bush v. Gore), and the Carter vs. Reagan 1980 October Surprise theory.

== Participants ==
- Charles Lewis, Founder of the Center for Public Integrity
- Robert McChesney, Professor at University of Illinois at Urbana-Champaign
- Mark Crispin Miller, Author, Professor at New York University
- Bernie Sanders, Congressman from Vermont
- Danny Schechter, Author and Media Critic
- Vincent Bugliosi, Attorney and Author
- Jeff Cohen, Founder of FAIR
- Dennis Kucinich, former Congressman
- Mark Lloyd, Visiting Professor at M.I.T.
- Michael Moore, Journalist and Activist
- John Nichols, Journalist and Activist
- Greg Palast, Journalist and Author
- Helen Thomas, Journalist and member of White House press corps

== Screenings ==
The film has aired in October 2004, on Free Speech TV, a non-profit TV station based in Denver, Colorado and Link TV.

== Reception ==
In 2004, Washington Post staff writer Desson Thomson found the documentary to feel like a do-over of the views and arguments in Fahrenheit 9/11, The Corporation and Outfoxed: Rupert Murdoch's War on Journalism.

== See also ==
- Manufacturing Consent: Noam Chomsky and the Media
- Spin
- The medium is the message
- Politico-media complex
- Propaganda model
- Carter vs. Reagan 1980 "October Surprise"
