= Avutometinib/defactinib =

Combination cancer medication

Combination of
- Avutometinib: Tyrosine kinase inhibitor
- Defactinib: Tyrosine kinase inhibitor

Clinical data
- Trade names: Avmapki Fakzynja Co-Pack
- AHFS/Drugs.com: Monograph
- MedlinePlus: a625072
- License data: US DailyMed: Avutometinib and defactinib
- Routes of administration: By mouth
- ATC code: None

Legal status
- Legal status: US: ℞-only

Identifiers
- KEGG: D13120

Avutometinib/defactinib, sold under the brand name Avmapki Fakzynja Co-Pack, is a co-packaged medication used for the treatment of ovarian cancer. It contains the anti-cancer medications avutometinib, a kinase inhibitor, as the potassium salt; and defactinib, a kinase inhibitor, as the hydrochloride. It is taken by mouth.

The most common adverse reactions including laboratory abnormalities, include increased creatine phosphokinase, nausea, fatigue, increased aspartate aminotransferase, rash, diarrhea, musculoskeletal pain, edema, decreased hemoglobin, increased alanine aminotransferase, vomiting, increased blood bilirubin, increased triglycerides, decreased lymphocyte count, abdominal pain, dyspepsia, dermatitis acneiform, vitreoretinal disorders, increased alkaline phosphatase, stomatitis, pruritus, visual impairment, decreased platelet count, constipation, dry skin, dyspnea, cough, urinary tract infection, and decreased neutrophil count.

Avutometinib/defactinib was approved for medical use in the United States in May 2025. The US Food and Drug Administration considers it to be a first-in-class medication.

== Medical uses ==
Avutometinib/defactinib is indicated for the treatment of adults with KRAS-mutated recurrent low-grade serous ovarian cancer who have received prior systemic therapy.

== History ==
Efficacy was evaluated in RAMP-201 (NCT04625270), an open-label, multi-center trial that included 57 adult participants with measurable KRAS-mutated recurrent low-grade serous ovarian cancer. Participants were required to have received at least one prior systemic therapy, including a platinum-based regimen. KRAS mutation status was determined by prospective local testing of tumor tissue. Participants received avutometinib 3.2 mg orally twice weekly and defactinib 200 mg orally twice daily, both taken for the first 3 weeks of each 4-week cycle until disease progression or unacceptable toxicity.

== Society and culture ==
=== Legal status ===
Avutometinib/defactinib was approved for medical use in the United States in May 2025. The FDA granted the application for avutometinib/defactinib priority review, breakthrough therapy, and orphan drug designations.
