= Life Biosciences =

American biopharmaceutical company

- Industry: Pharmaceutical; Medical technology
- Key people: David A. Sinclair
- Website: lifebiosciences.com

Life Biosciences is a Boston-based biopharmaceutical company focused on developing epigenetic medicines for aging and age-related diseases. The company was founded in 2017 by Harvard Medical School professor David Sinclair. In early 2026, the US Food and Drug Administration cleared Life Biosciences to begin testing its investigational, adeno-associated viral vector drug, ER-100, for treatment of optic neuropathies including certain types of glaucoma and non-arteritic anterior ischemic optic neuropathy. The drug is proposed to work by expressing Yamanaka factors to alter DNA methylation states.
