= Jan Vijg =

Biogerontologist

- Born: Rotterdam, Netherlands
- Scientific career
- Fields: Genetics
- Institutions: Albert Einstein College of Medicine

Jan Vijg is the Lola and Saul Kramer Chairperson in Molecular Genetics at the Department of Genetics at the Albert Einstein College of Medicine, New York City, United States. Prior to this appointment, he was a professor at the Buck Institute for Research on Aging (Novato, California).

His research interests include studying genomic instability in aging. In 1989, he created the first transgenic mouse models for the study of in vivo mutagenesis. He discusses his genomic/epigenomic drift hypothesis as a cause of aging in his book Aging of the Genome: The Dual Role of DNA in Life and Death'.

In his second book, The American Technological Challenge: Stagnation and Decline in the 21st Century, he argues that technological innovation has decelerated ever since 1970.

Vijg is co-editor-in-chief of the journal Aging published by Impact Journals (Albany, New York).

== Genome instability in aging and disease ==
Genome instability, i.e., the tendency of the genome to acquire mutations and epimutations, underlies human genetic disease, causally contributes to cancer and has also been implicated in aging and age-related, degenerative conditions other than cancer. Little is known about the mechanisms that give rise to spontaneous changes in the genome or epigenome and how this may lead, in somatic cells, to increased cancer risk and loss of organ and tissue function with age. We study genome and epigenome instability as a function of age in various model organisms, including mouse and fruit fly, and its consequences in terms of alterations in tissue-specific patterns of gene regulation. We developed transgenic reporter systems in mouse and fruit fly, which allow us to determine tissue-specific frequencies of various forms of genome instability, e.g., point mutations, deletions, translocations. By crossing the mutational reporter animals with mutants harboring specific defects in various genome maintenance pathways, the relevance of these pathways for the accumulation of specific forms of genome instability is assessed, in relation to the pathophysiology of aging. Similarly, by using knockdown approaches we assess the effect of specific genes implicated in longevity and healthy aging, e.g., SOD, FOXO, SIR2, on genome integrity. More recently, we have begun to assess global gene mutation and epimutation loads in normal and disease tissues of both animal models and humans using massively parallel sequencing approaches.

== Books written ==
1. Aging of the Genome: The Dual Role of DNA in Life and Death
2. The American Technological Challenge: Stagnation and Decline in the 21st Century

== Selected publications ==
- "Somatic mutations and aging: a re-evaluation." Vijg, J. Mutation Research, 2000.
- "Aging and genome maintenance: Lessons from the mouse?" Hasty, P; Campisi, J; Hoeijmakers, J; et al. Science, 2003.
- "A new progeroid syndrome reveals that genotoxic stress suppresses the somatotroph axis." Niedernhofer, Laura J.; Garinis, George A.; Raams, Anja; et al. Nature, 2006.
- "Increased cell-to-cell variation in gene expression in ageing mouse heart." Bahar, Rumana; Hartmann, Claudia H.; Rodriguez, Karl A.; et al. Nature, 2006.
- "Controlled induction of DNA double-strand breaks in the mouse liver induces features of tissue ageing." White, Ryan R.; Milholland, Brandon; de Bruin, Alain; et al. Nature Communications, 2015.
- "Interventions to Slow Aging in Humans: Are We Ready?" Longo, Valter D.; Antebi, Adam; Bartke, Andrzej; et al. Aging Cell, 2015.
- "Age-related somatic mutations in the cancer genome." Milholland, Brandon; Auton, Adam; Suh, Yousin; et al. Oncotarget, 2015.
- "Comprehensive transcriptional landscape of aging mouse liver." White, Ryan R.; Milholland, Brandon; MacRae, Sheila L.; et al. BMC Genomics, 2015.
- "DNA repair in species with extreme lifespan differences." MacRae, Sheila L.; Croken, Matthew McKnight; Calder, R. B.; et al. Aging, 2015.
- "Restricted diet delays accelerated ageing and genomic stress in DNA-repair-deficient mice." Vermeij, W. P.; Dolle, M. E. T.; Reiling, E.; et al. Nature, 2016.
- "Evidence for a limit to human lifespan." Dong, Xiao; Milholland, Brandon; Vijg, Jan. Nature, 2016.
