= Vera Gorbunova =

Researcher

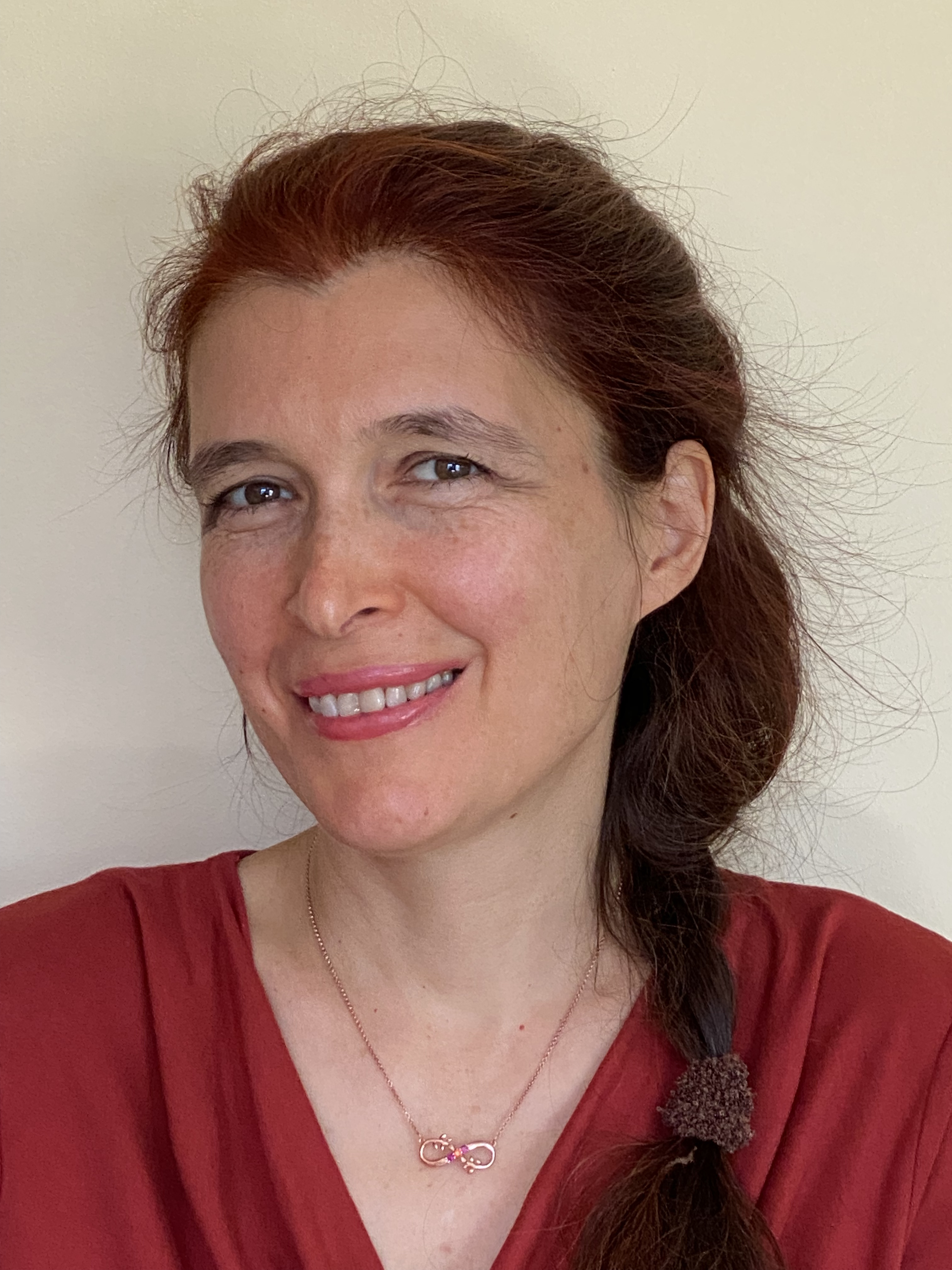
- Spouse: Andrei Seluanov

Academic background
- Education: BSc, Saint Petersburg State University; PhD, Weizmann Institute of Science

Academic work
- Institutions: University of Rochester

Vera Gorbunova is a biologist. As the Doris Johns Cherry Professor at the University of Rochester, Gorbunova identified high molecular weight hyaluronan as the key mediator of cancer resistance in the naked mole rat.

== Early life and education ==
Gorbunova completed her Bachelor of Science degree at Saint Petersburg State University and her Ph.D. at the Weizmann Institute of Science. During her doctoral studies, Gorbunova and professor Avi Levy investigated the genetic mutations of plants in comparison to mammals. Following this, she completed her Postdoctoral Fellowship at McGill University in the Hekimi Lab.

== Career ==
In 2004, Gorbunova and Andrei Seluanov established a research laboratory at the University of Rochester to study the evolution of tumour suppressor mechanisms in rodents. Two years later, Gorbunova conducted a study which discovered that the enzyme telomerase had a more significant correlation with body mass than longevity. She revealed that one's body mass caused a greater risk of cancer than one's lifespan. She continued her focus on cancer cells and co-developed a gene that produced a thousand times more protein in cancer cells than in healthy cells. In 2008, her research team stripped the protein RAD51 and replaced it with a marker protein DNA which killed breast cancer, fibrosarcoma, and cervical cancer cells with minimal effect on normal cells. Following this discovery, Gorbunova focused her cancer-fighting experiments on the naked mole rat. In 2009, she published research that showed the mole rat's cells expressed a gene called p16 which prevented tumours from developing. As a result of their "pioneering research on the causes of cancer resistance in naked mole-rats," Gorbunova and Seluanov won the 2009 Cozzarelli Prize. She also received a 2010 Glenn Award for Research in Biological Mechanisms of Aging for "groundbreaking work that has the potential to shed light on the biological process of ageing, and could benefit from an infusion of unexpected funding."

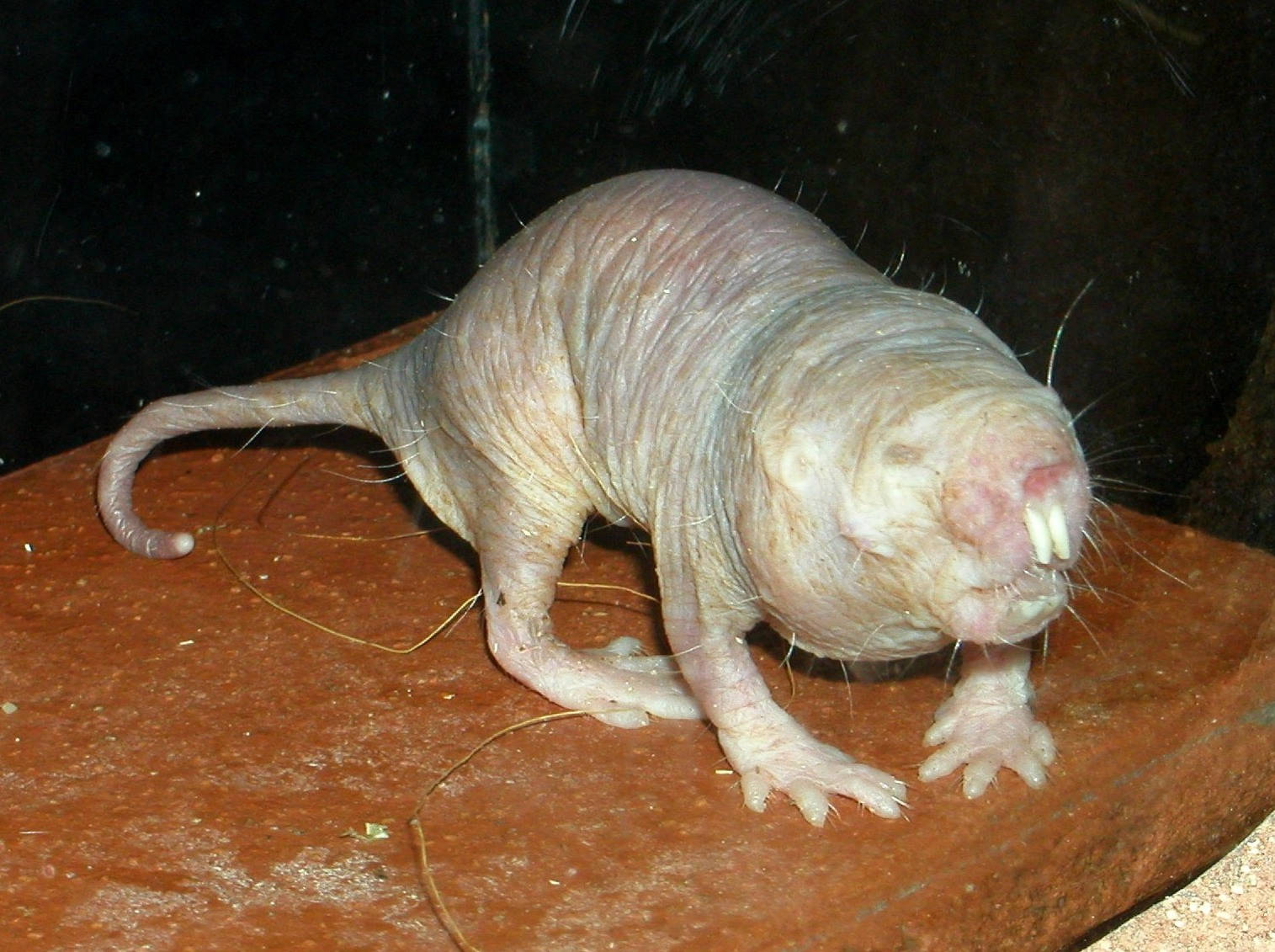
A photo of a naked mole rat, the focus of Gorbunova's studies

Throughout her tenure at the University of Rochester, Gorbunova's research team continued to focus on the naked mole rat as a key to understanding cancer resistance among animals. In 2013, Gorbunova and Seluanov identified high molecular weight hyaluronan as the key mediator of cancer resistance in the naked mole rat. As a result of their work, the rodent was named the Vertebrate of the Year by Science Magazine. She also solely received the Associations de Prevoyance Sante Longevity Research Award for her contribution to the study of ageing. In 2014, Gorbunova was appointed the Doris Johns Cherry Professor and began to lead an National Institute on Aging project to explore the factors responsible for longevity.

During the COVID-19 pandemic, Gorbunova's research team compared the longevity and virus resistance mechanisms within bats to suggest treatments for diseases in humans. She later received a grant to explore potential targets of treatments and therapeutics for neurodegenerative diseases. Gorbunova also stepped down as co-editor of the journal Aging Cell, along with the remaining three editors in chiefs, due to their increased workloads without assistance.

== Personal life ==
Gorbunova is married to fellow biologist Andrei Seluanov.
