= Axial Biotech =

Company in Salt Lake City, Utah, US

Axial Biotech, Inc.
- Type: Privately held
- Founded: 2002; 24 years ago SLC, Utah, USA
- Defunct: 2013; 13 years ago
- Headquarters: Salt Lake City
- Website: www.axialbiotech.com

Axial Biotech, Inc. was a privately held molecular diagnostics company based in Salt Lake City, Utah. It was founded in 2002.

Axial Biotech conducted genetic research on scoliosis and degenerative disc disease.

In September 2009, Axial Biotech announced the commercial launch of the ScoliScore AIS Prognostic Test, a DNA-based diagnostic test for scoliosis. In 2012, Transgenomic acquired the rights to the ScoliScore test.

== AIS genetic testing ==
AIS genetic testing is the process of analyzing the DNA of a patient who has been diagnosed with adolescent idiopathic scoliosis to determine his or her likelihood of progression to a severe spinal curve.

Approximately 4% of AIS patients will progress to the point where surgery is done. The majority of adolescents with idiopathic scoliosis are observed at regular intervals (usually between 4–6 months) with a physical exam and x-ray to evaluate the magnitude of the curve.

Adolescent Idiopathic Scoliosis is a polygenic trait, meaning it is affected by the characteristics of more than a single gene. The heritability of scoliosis has long been suspected, and many research projects have been conducted in search of the genes responsible for the disease.

Axial Biotech performed a genome-wide association study to find any associated with scoliosis. Over the course of the research, DNA samples from over 9500 patients from 100 clinical sites worldwide were analyzed.

Researchers at Axial Biotech identified 53 genetic markers (28 which, when positive, contribute to the progression of the scoliosis curve and 25 which, when positive, protect against the progression of the curve.) The ScoliScore test was developed around these 53 markers.

== ScoliScore ==
ScoliScore AIS Prognostic Test is a genetic test that analyzes the DNA of patients who are diagnosed with Adolescent Idiopathic Scoliosis, the most common type of scoliosis. The test shows the likelihood of spinal curve progression. In other words, it helps doctors and patients to see how likely it is that a patient's spine will become more curved and whether it is likely that the patient will eventually need surgery or other interventions.

Approximately 85-90% of patients initially diagnosed with AIS will never have their mild scoliotic curve progress to a magnitude that requires surgical treatment. The test results may be used to predict, with over 99% probability, when a mild scoliotic curve is unlikely to progress to the point of requiring surgical treatment. This knowledge can make it unnecessary for these patients to undergo numerous office visits and be exposed to radiographic imaging over many years to monitor potential curve progression. A ScoliScore test is a powerful tool, which helps physicians predict spinal curvature through one test, accomplishing what was previously only possible through years of observation.

The test is distributed by DePuy Spine, a Johnson & Johnson company. It was made available in a few physicians' offices in September 2009 and was commercially launched in 2010.

In 2012, Transgenomic acquired the rights to the ScoliScore test.
