= Radiographic anatomy =

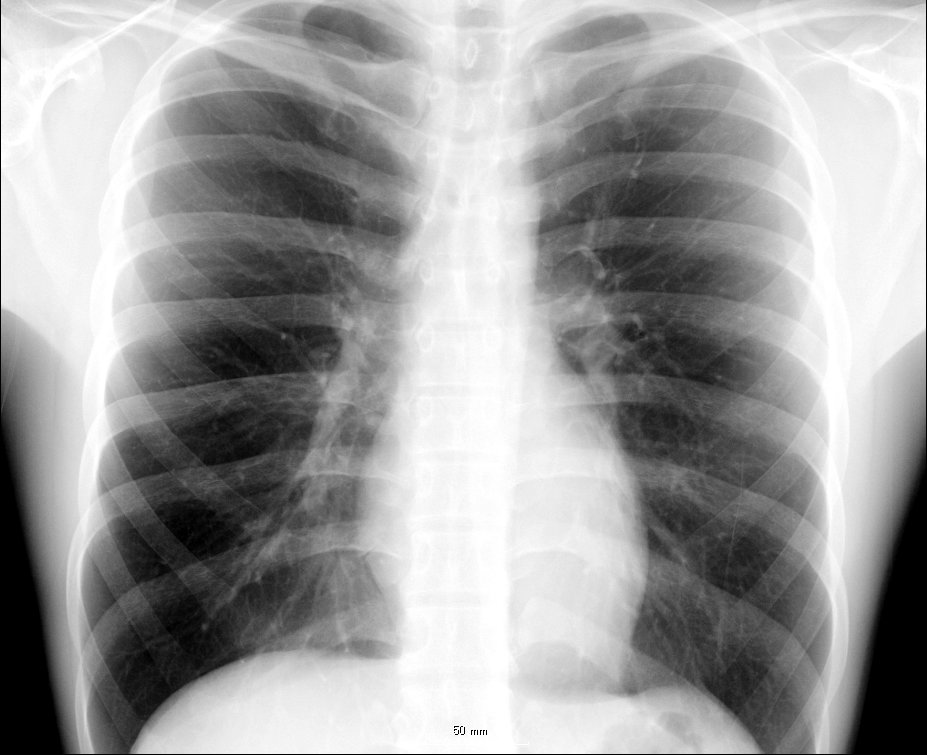

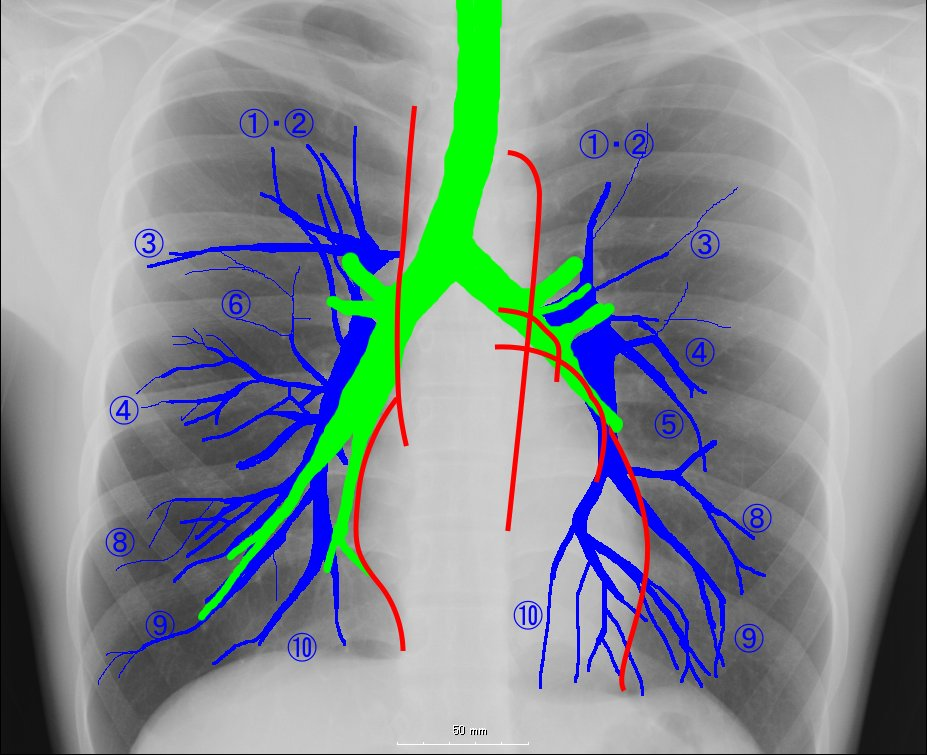
Human chest radiographic anatomy.

Radioanatomy (x-ray anatomy) is an anatomy discipline that involves studying anatomy through the use of radiographic films. The x-ray film represents a two-dimensional image of a three-dimensional object due to the summary projection of different anatomical structures onto a planar surface.

It requires certain skills for the correct interpretation of such images. Radiological anatomy is a necessary component of training for medical students and radiologists.
