= Translational glycobiology =

Pharmaceutical development using glycomics and glycoengineering

Translational glycobiology or applied glycobiology is the branch of glycobiology and glycochemistry that focuses on developing new pharmaceuticals through glycomics and glycoengineering. Although research in this field presents many difficulties, translational glycobiology presents applications with therapeutic glycoconjugates, with treating various bone diseases, and developing therapeutic cancer vaccines and other targeted therapies. Some mechanisms of action include using the glycan for drug targeting, engineering protein glycosylation for better efficacy, and glycans as drugs themselves.

A central method in translational glycobiology is the method of glycorandomization, where complex sugar chains known as glycans are enzymatically attached to candidate drug molecules (often proteins or lipids) at diverse sequence positions, producing myriad permutations of the drug known as glycoforms. The pharmacokinetics of these variants are then tested, to see if therapeutic outcomes are improved.

== Background ==
Glycans, or polysaccharides, are instrumental in many facets of biology, from decorations on cell membranes being involved in cell signaling and interaction to post-translational modifications on proteins warranting function. Yet even though sugars are the most abundant class of organic molecules found on earth, the study of their structure and function are not as well known as other biological molecules such as proteins and ribonucleic acids. This is partly due to the fact that glycans have no direct biosynthetic template in the genome, as opposed to protein, and thus have not been as effectively elucidated by the age of genomics. Furthermore, the polymeric nature of glycans presents a challenge to study, as there are plethora of combinations of linkages (unlike in DNA and protein) and many different types of monosaccharides and isomers.

Seeing as glycans play a key role in the biology of organisms, translational glycobiology thus aims to utilize them both as targets for drugs or as drugs themselves. New or improved glycan products arise as more is learned about the complex biological and chemical roles glycans play, paralleled by advancements in the carbohydrate synthesis toolbox.

== Therapeutic uses ==
Since glycans play an important role in intercellular interactions and protein, they serve as viable targets for various therapeutic interactions. Multiple current therapeutics aim to take advantage of their role in signaling pathways, and target their biosynthesis or engineer related glycoproteins. These interactions can be controlled by encouraging or inhibiting the presence of those glycans that mediate signaling, which is the mechanism of action for a number of extant drugs, including heparin, erythropoietin, the antivirals oseltamivir and zanamivir, and the Hib vaccine. Furthermore, the glycans themselves can serve as drugs and there is ongoing research and development to engineer more effective ones.

=== Drug targeting ===
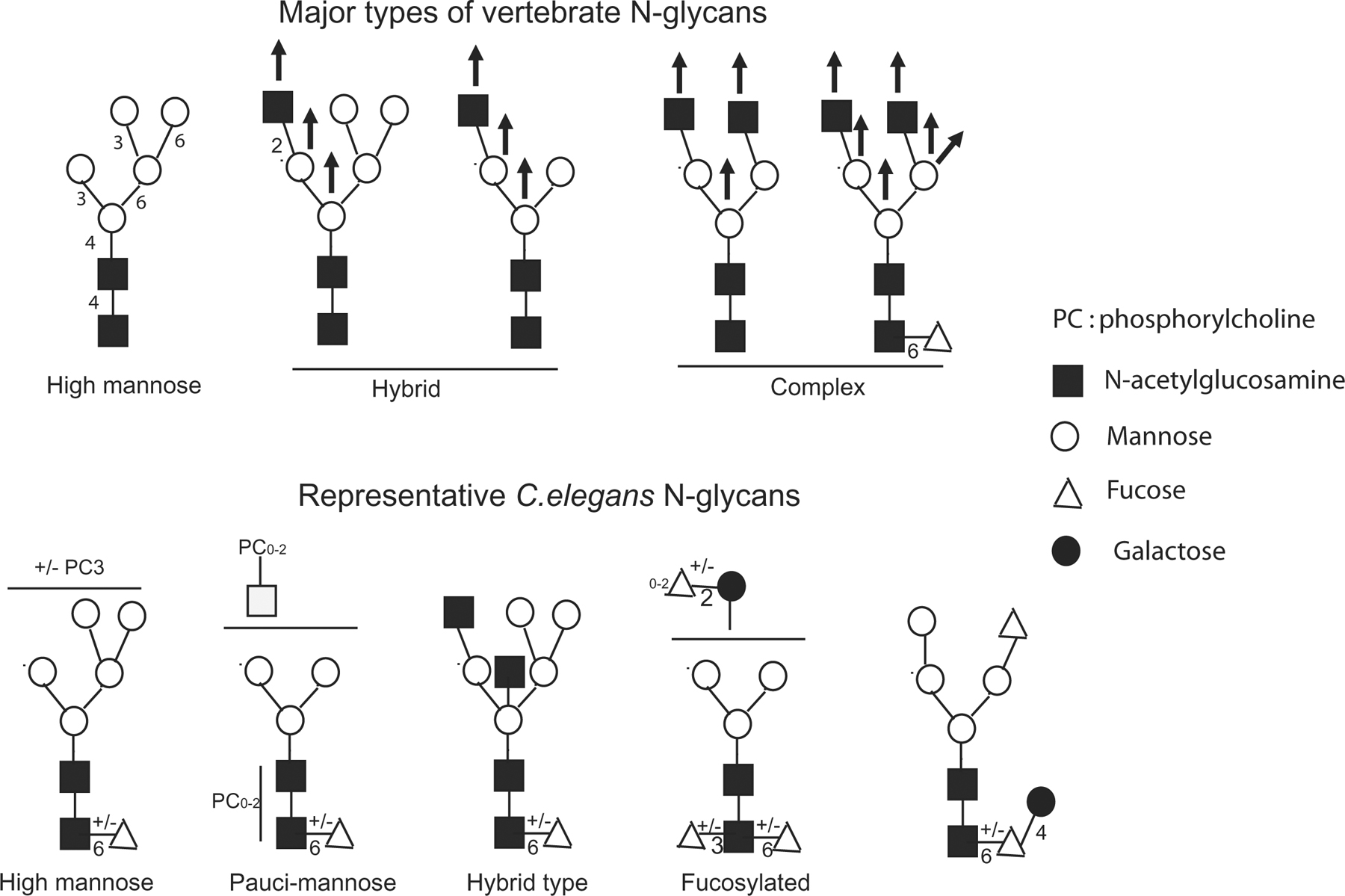
Overview of several types of N-glycans that can vary on different HIV strains.

The surfaces of cancer cells often exhibit aberrant glycosylation, which serves to mediate cell proliferation, metastasis, and tumor progression. However, because these glycans often differ from those present on healthy cells, they also serve as candidates to act as cancer biomarkers for use in diagnostics and in developing targeted therapies that discriminate between cancerous cells and normal host tissue. One such therapy involves the use of enzyme inhibitors that target those enzymes involved in the biosynthesis of cancer-associated glycans. Another treatment is cancer immunotherapy, which directs the immune system to attack tumor cells expressing the targeted altered glycoconjugates.

For example, modifying CD44 antigens using glycosyltransferase-programmed stereosubstitution (GPS), the HCELL expression on the surfaces of human mesenchymal stem cells and hematopoietic stem cells can be enforced, effectively homing those cells to the bone marrow of their host. Once mesenchymal stem cells transmigrate through the bone marrow endothelium, they differentiate into osteoblasts and begin contributing to bone formation. This technique has been proposed as a potential treatment for numerous bone diseases, including osteogenesis imperfecta.

Other therapeutic measures involving glycans include epitope recognition for both vaccine and antibody production. This has been an area of interest especially in the field of HIV vaccines, as the immense genetic diversity of strains and high degree of glycosylation leads to much difficulty in developing antibodies that bind to viral particles. The heavy glycosylation of these proteins can mask peptide epitopes, making designing antibodies targeted to certain proteins sections all the more difficult. Therefore, some have turned to translational glycobiology to develop antibodies using semi-synthetic and fully synthetic oligosaccharides as antigens. Many of these discoveries have focused on the GP120 surface glycoprotein, which is naturally heavily glycosylated with high mannose glycans.

=== Protein glycosylation ===
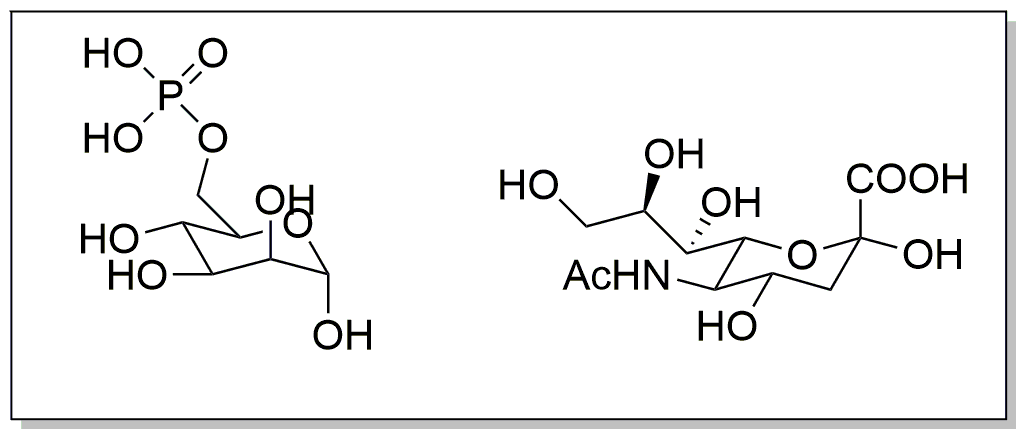
Mannose-6-phosphate (left) and sialic acid (right) are common saccharides that are found on glycosylated residues.

Many proteins are glycosylated on certain residues, which can affect the proteome.

Glycans can interact with receptors, which in turn affect their cellular and subcellular localization. For example, cytokines and the subgroup chemokines are small signaling proteins that are involved in the immune response. Many of the N-linked glycans on these cytokines play an important role in metabolic turnover and by engineering the glycoform and its branching, there can be advantageous physiochemical affects on the immune response.

Furthermore, glycosylated proteins, or glycoproteins, can have increased resistance to degradation by proteases, which will increase the half-life of those proteins. For example, interferon beta has been shown to be important in the treatment of multiple sclerosis. Recombinant versions of interferon beta have been produced in Escherichia coli, with the glycosylated form being more stable and resistant to protease degradation, while the non-glycosylated form is degraded much more quickly. Engineered glycoproteins have also been instrumental in enzyme replacement therapy (ERT). This has been of particular interest in the development of therapeutics for lysosomal storage disease. Proper delivery of these enzymes is highly dependent on the mannose 6-phosphate (M6P) tagging on N-glycans. Thus, engineering of these N-glyans, such as by modification of branching patterns, sialic acid capping, M6P tagging, monosaccharide constituents, and glycosidic bond linkage, there can be increased efficacy of lysosomal targeting and better delivery to the central nervous system through the blood brain barrier. Additionally, glycoengineering has been utilized with neural stem cell cultures to increase adhesion to the extracellular matrix through the treatment of an N-acetylmannosamine analog.

=== Glycan small molecule drugs ===
Chemical structure of zanamivir

Glycans and glycan-based molecules have been used as drugs themselves. The two main functions of these drugs are to either bind protein or inhibit glycosyl degradation. For example, engineered glycans, such as zanamivir and oseltamivir have been designed to bind to viral sialidases, which are enzymes that play key roles in viral replication cycles, such as for influenza. With these sialidases inhibited, viral budding and entry into host cells is inhibited. Other drugs, such as miglitol and acarbose, serve as therapeutic drugs to people with Type 2 diabetes, as these engineered glycan derivatives bind to glucosidases and amylases to help control patient's blood sugar level.

== See also ==
- Consortium for Functional Glycomics
- Glycobiology (journal)
