= NASDAQ Biotechnology Index =

The NASDAQ Biotechnology Index is a stock market index made up of securities of NASDAQ-listed companies classified according to the Industry Classification Benchmark as either the Biotechnology or the Pharmaceutical industry. A list of the 225 components of the index is published online.

== Criteria ==
In order to remain included within the index, the components must meet the following criteria:

- The security U.S. listing must be exclusively on the NASDAQ National Market (unless the security was dually listed on another U.S. market prior to January 1, 2004 and has continuously maintained such listing).
- The issuer of the security must be classified according to the Industry Classification Benchmark as either Biotechnology or Pharmaceuticals.
- The security may not be issued by an issuer currently in bankruptcy proceedings.
- The security must have a market capitalization of at least $200 million.
- The security must have an average daily trading volume of at least 100,000 shares.
- The issuer of the security may not have entered into a definitive agreement or other arrangement which would likely result in the security no longer being Index.
- The issuer of the security may not have annual financial statements with an audit opinion that is currently withdrawn.
- The issuer of the security must have "seasoned" on NASDAQ or another recognized market for at least 6 months; in the case of spin-offs, the operating history of the spin-off will be considered.

== Investing in the index ==
This index is tracked by several exchange-traded funds, the most liquid of which is the iShares Nasdaq Biotechnology (Nasdaq: IBB).
