= Michelle Dipp =

American scientist, businesswoman and investor

- Education: Brasenose College; Oxford University (MD PhD)
- Spouse: Bill Detwiler (2021–current)
- Parents: Mike Dipp, Jr. (father); Mary Ann Dipp (mother)
- Website: https://michelle-dipp.com/

Michelle Dipp is an American scientist, businesswoman, and investor. She is the co-founder and a managing partner at Biospring Partners and serves on the board of Abzena and Kiniciti.

== Early life and education ==
Michelle Dipp was raised in El Paso, Texas. Her mother was a nurse in the ER and her father was a businessman. During her childhood she had the dream to become a professional ballerina.

Dipp attended Loretto Academy, where she graduated in 1994. She graduated with a bachelor's degree, an M.D., and a Ph.D. in physiology from Oxford University.

== Career ==
After graduation, Dipp moved to Boston, Massachusetts. In 2005, she began working at Sirtris Pharmaceuticals, a startup that created drugs that were meant to slow aging and protect against degenerative diseases related to aging. The company researched and tested activators of sirtuin, such as resveratrol formulations. In 2008, she became vice president of corporate development at Sirtris Pharmaceuticals.

Sirtris was purchased and made a subsidiary of GlaxoSmithKline in 2008. At GlaxoSmithKline, Dipp became the head of their Center of Excellence for External Drug Discovery.

=== 2008–2010 ===
In 2008, Dipp worked with Christoph Westphal, Richard Aldrich, and Alexey Margolin to found Alnara Pharmaceuticals, which was created to develop ways to formulate biopharmaceuticals so they could be taken by mouth, instead of by injection.

In February 2010, Dipp, Westphal, and Aldrich formed a new venture fund called Longwood Founders Fund. In August 2010, the Longwood team co-founded VeraStem by providing seed funding and office space its offices; Verastem aimed to isolate cancer stem cells and then discover drugs that would selectively kill them. The company held its IPO in 2012.

=== 2015–2020 ===
In January 2015 Longwood and Dipp helped found Flex Pharma In November 2016 Dipp and Longwood helped launch Axial Biotherapeutics where she took a board seat. In October 2017 Dipp became the Managing Director at General Atlantic, a global growth equity firm based in New York City. Michelle launched their first life sciences investment platform and served as a member of the life sciences investment committee while at General Atlantic. Michelle served as a Board Observer for Ginkgo BioWorks and as a board member for PathAI and Immunocore.

In 2020, Dipp founded Biospring Partners with Jennifer Lum to conduct venture capital in the life sciences industry. Investments for Biospring Partners include funding for Abzena who were subsequently selected to work on the antibody cocktail for COVID 19 treatment. On June 30, 2020, the Securities and Exchange Commission announced that Michelle Dipp, a co-founder and former CEO of the now defunct OvaScience, Inc., agreed to settle fraud charges for misleading investors about the availability and commercial prospects for the company’s fertility treatments that were in development.

== Awards and honors ==
- Stevie Award for Women in Business, Best Executive of a non-services business (2008)
- Ten Outstanding Young Leaders (TOYL) Award from the Greater Boston Chamber of Commerce (2014)
- Fortune Magazine's "40 under 40" (2015)
