= Oogonial stem cells =

Oogonial stem cells (OSCs), also known as egg precursor cells or female germline cells, are diploid germline cells with stem cell characteristics: the ability to renew and differentiate into other cell types, different from their tissue of origin. Present in invertebrates and some lower vertebrate species, they have been extensively studied in Caenorhabditis elegans, Drosophila melanogaster. OSCs allow the production of new female reproductive cells (oocytes) by the process of oogenesis during an organism's reproductive life.

== Invertebrates ==
=== Caenorhabditis elegans ===
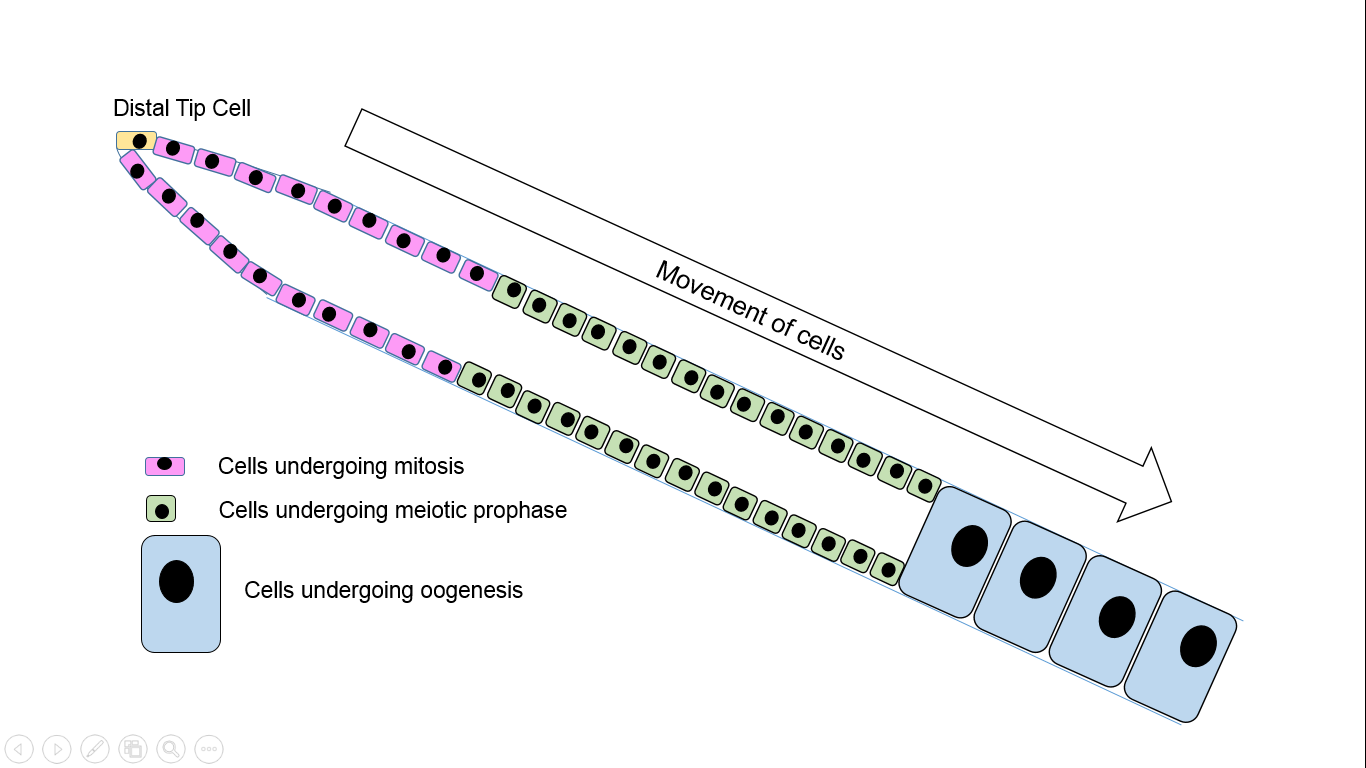
Development of oogonial stem cells in C. elegans adult hermaphrodites

The nematode Caenorhabditis elegans (C. elegans) are nematodes can have hermaphroditic or male reproductive capabilities. In males, only spermatogenesis occurs; hermaphrodites can produce spermatozoa until adulthood, when oogenesis takes over.

All oogonial stem cells in C. elegans are derived from one distal-tip cell (DTC), which acts as a niche to ensure that germline proliferation continues. As the DTC undergoes mitosis, the cells move proximally along the organism and passing from the mitotic-proliferative region into the meiotic cycle. During this cycle, the cells complete meiotic prophase before passing into the zone of oogenesis (or spermatogenesis, depending on the sex and age of the organism).

=== D. melanogaster ===
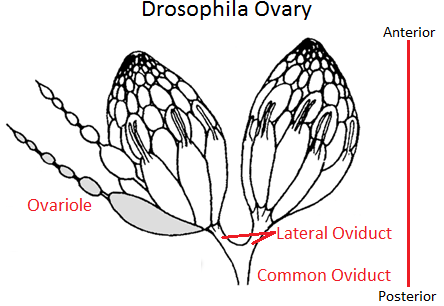
Drosophila ovary

Drosophila melanogaster (D. melanogaster), commonly known as the fruit fly, is a dioecious (two-sex) invertebrate. Female D. melanogasters have two ovaries, each of which have 16 ovarioles. The linear development from oogonial stem cells to mature oocyte is similar to that of C. elegans. In D. melanogaster, the 14-stage development of the oocyte is from the anterior to the posterior ovariole. Mature oocytes are then stored in the uterus after passing through the oviduct, to wait for the egg deposition.

== Vertebrates ==
In mammals, oogenesis is believed to be primarily prenatal. The existence of oogonial stem cells in mammals is controversial, except for the finding of OSCs in two species of loris and three species of bat.

In 2004, considerable evidence was provided for the existence of germline stem cells in adult mouse ovaries capable of generating oocytes to form new follicles. Questions exist about cell-sorting techniques used to isolate the OSCs, and some researchers prefer the less-conclusive term "female germline stem cells" to "OSCs". New research indicates that oogonial stem cells do not exist in mice and there is no convincing evidence they exist in other mammals.

== Research ==
A study published in 2015 reported that the formation of new oocytes from newly-discovered germline stem cells, known as oogonial stem cells, has opened new avenues for the treatment of female infertility.

Research by Zuckerman et al. published in 1951, established a central dogma that neo-oogenesis in mammals does not occur postnatally. These conclusions were supported by other researches, such as Peters et al., who investigated DNA synthesis in oocytes during embryonic development. However, since they didn't study oogenesis postnatally, they could not make any conclusions about postnatal oogenesis. In 1967, Loannou et al., studied proliferation of oogonia and sought to identify whether they were undergoing mitosis. They would be able to show this if there was observance of mitotic activity and whether or not they were contributing to stem cell populations. To do this, they used haematoxylin stains to stain for mitotic divisions. However, these results were inconclusive as they did not have oocyte markers and thus could not say for sure that these cells were a part of the stem cell population. A number of scientists have since then used mathematical models to suggest that, without an oocyte stem cell (OSC) population, the female mammal will not have enough oocytes to complete their reproductive lives due to rate of atresia during the normal cycle is significant. However, in 2004, new research by Jonathan Tilly and colleagues came about to suggest that a new population of stem cells in female mammals does exist, which could possibly be used for personalized therapeutics. Using mouse studies, they were able to detect OSCs that were able to generate new eggs within these mouse ovaries. Tilly et al. used GFP to try to label the OSCs, but they didn't know exactly where to find these stem cell populations, so it is difficult to say whether somatic cells or stem cells were labeled. This study challenged previously expected notions, as it contradicted the central dogma of oogenesis, and has thus led to a rapid increase in the amount of researching being conducted to suggest whether there does indeed exist oocyte stem cells in the mammalian ovary. Lineage tracing and other studies, following initial observations in Tilly's lab, have found no supporting evidence for oogonial stem cells.
