= Pro-aging trance =

Sociocultural phenomenon

Pro-aging trance, also known as pro-aging edifice, is a term coined by British author and biomedical gerontologist Aubrey de Grey to describe the broadly positive and fatalistic attitude toward aging in society.

== Overview ==
According to de Grey, the pro-aging trance explains why many people gloss over aging through irrational thought patterns. The concept says that the thought of one's own body slowly but ceaselessly deteriorating is so burdensome that it seems most sensible from a psychological point of view to try to put it out of one's mind. Since aging has been present throughout human history, this coping strategy would be deeply rooted in human thinking. It is striking that, in defending their point of view, those affected often commit fallacies which, from experience, would not be expected of them in a different context.

The name, according to de Grey, comes from the similarity of persons affected to hypnotised people, whose subconscious minds in the trance state prefer to resort to illogical explanations rather than abandon a deeply-held belief.

The pro-aging trance consists both in the belief that the aging process is inevitable and therefore will not be prevented even by future developments, and in the view that any success in the fight against aging would have mainly negative societal effects. Examples cited include boredom, overpopulation, unresolved problems regarding current pension systems, and dictators living forever, but there is no nuanced and factual discussion of counter-arguments and proposed solutions and no juxtaposition or weighing of these potential disadvantages with the benefits of eliminating aging (such as saving about 100,000 lives per day).

De Grey assumes that robust mouse rejuvenation will provide a paradigm shift in society in this regard.

== Issues ==
According to de Grey, the phenomenon of the pro-aging trance is a hurdle in the rapid development of anti-aging medicine. He claims the reason it takes time for people to break out of it and the result of lacking public support was low research funding.

Furthermore, aging is not socially perceived as a disease to be fought, which is why it is more difficult to get support for fighting it than for fighting cancer, Alzheimer's disease, or similar illnesses. De Grey sees the reason for this in the rhetoric of many gerontologists during the 1950s, 1960s, and 1970s, who usually drew a line in public communication between age-related diseases and "aging itself", even though the former were merely late stages of aging and therefore should not be viewed independently of the aging process. Moreover, he argues that the post-aging world is portrayed predominantly as dystopian in fiction, hence reinforcing people in their assumption that defeating aging is undesirable.

== Reception ==
The American philosopher Benjamin Ross criticises de Grey's approach to aging in his dissertation, saying that it is precisely his activism and the associated intention to wake people up from the pro-aging trance that is, whether he realises it or not, first defined by aging. He and other anti-aging activists would build almost their entire lives around the fact of age-related death. By achieving their goal of defeating the pro-aging trance and, by extension, aging, they would therefore also abolish an important aspect of their identity and the very circumstance that currently gives meaning to their lives. Other works are also critical of the condemnation of the opposition to anti-aging with the term "trance". For example, it is mentioned that this, just like the "deathism" denounced by Nick Bostrom, prevents an evaluation of the discussion beyond the binary view of "death bad, extended life good".

The German bioethicist Mark Schweda argues that far-reaching interventions in the aging process must always be carefully weighed up, but that in the meantime no one can invoke the image of aging as a "totally unavailable natural reality", if only because scientific and cultural developments have already made it obsolete. At the same time, however, he criticises the modern "naturalistic" view of aging, which reduces it to physical decay and ignores all other aspects. Another bioethicist, Gregor Wolbring, agreed that longevity researchers reject the rhetoric of ending aging entirely, but contended that ramifications of the proposal raised complications. Arthur Diamond, author of Openness to Creative Destruction: Sustaining Innovative Dynamism, embraced the concept as well as something needing to be conquered if death is to be overcome.

The described pro-aging attitude is compared to the Stockholm syndrome by anti-aging advocates in the context of examining possible reasons for rejecting life-prolonging technologies: just as hostages sympathise with their captors after a certain period of time, people come to terms with the idea that they will age and eventually die.

The Russian computer scientist and biotechnologist Alex Zhavoronkov assumes that the cause of the pro-aging trance lies in the tendency of people not to want to get their hopes up unnecessarily. He also posits that once the possibility of a dramatic extension of the healthy human lifespan is present, it can trigger feelings of guilt that one does nothing to hasten its implementation, which is why it is easier to block it out.

The American social psychologist Tom Pyszczynski, one of the founding psychologists of terror management theory, explains the opposition to life-prolonging therapies with exactly this model. According to him, the cause of that opposition is paradoxically that the critics fear death and actually long for radical life extension. However, since they do not consider it feasible or likely in their remaining lifetime, they try to deal with the terror caused by their own mortality through investing in a cultural worldview in the hope of achieving literal or symbolic immortality. The actual possibility of life extension challenges the beliefs and values that serve them as their protector from death-related thoughts. It thus generates the need to defend them and object to treatments that would actually extend lifespan. This goes hand in hand with the mortality salience hypothesis.

According to representatives of the anti-aging movement, learned helplessness could also play a role in why many people resign themselves to aging. In 1967, the psychologist and behavioural scientist Martin Seligman showed that dogs that are exposed to mild electric shocks and realise that they cannot do anything about it tend to continue to endure the shocks after this phase, even if they have the opportunity to avoid them. Proponents of life extension compare this to the attitude which many people show toward their own aging process: in their opinion, these people have learned that any attempt to fight against aging is in vain and will therefore disregard new possibilities.

== See also ==
- Cognitive bias
- Longevity escape velocity
- The Fable of the Dragon-Tyrant — short story referencing the phenomenon
