= Convict =

Person found guilty of a crime and sentenced by a court

A convict is "a person found guilty of a crime and sentenced by a court" or "a person serving a sentence in prison". Convicts are often also known as "prisoners" or "inmates" or by the slang term "con", while a common label for former convicts, especially those recently released from prison, is "ex-con" ("ex-convict"). Persons convicted and sentenced to non-custodial sentences tend not to be described as "convicts".

The label of "ex-convict" usually has lifelong implications, such as social stigma or reduced opportunities for employment. The federal government of Australia, for instance, will not, in general, employ an ex-convict, while some state and territory governments may limit the time for or before which a former convict may be employed.

== Historical usage ==
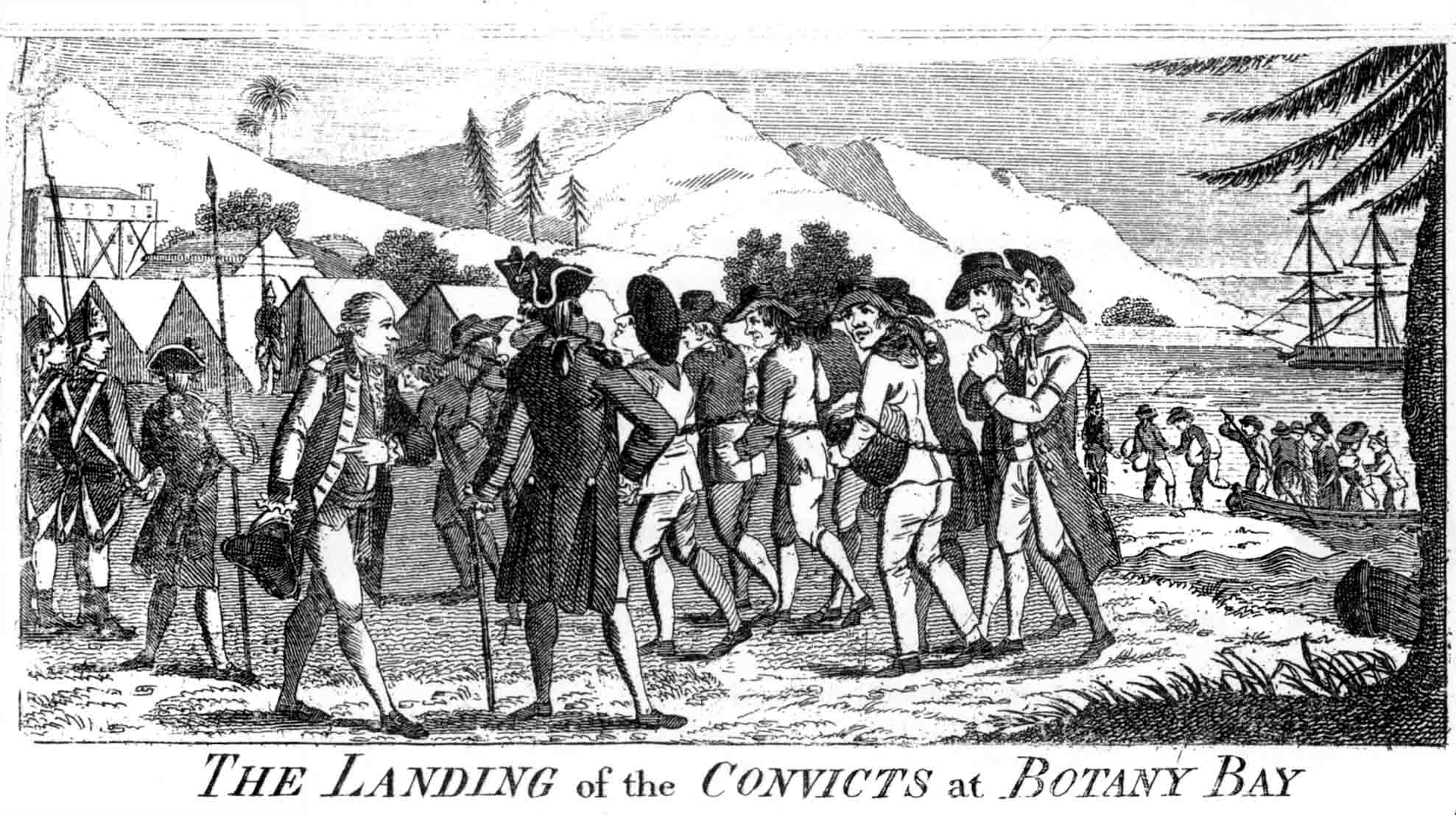
Convicts at Botany Bay, New South Wales, 1789

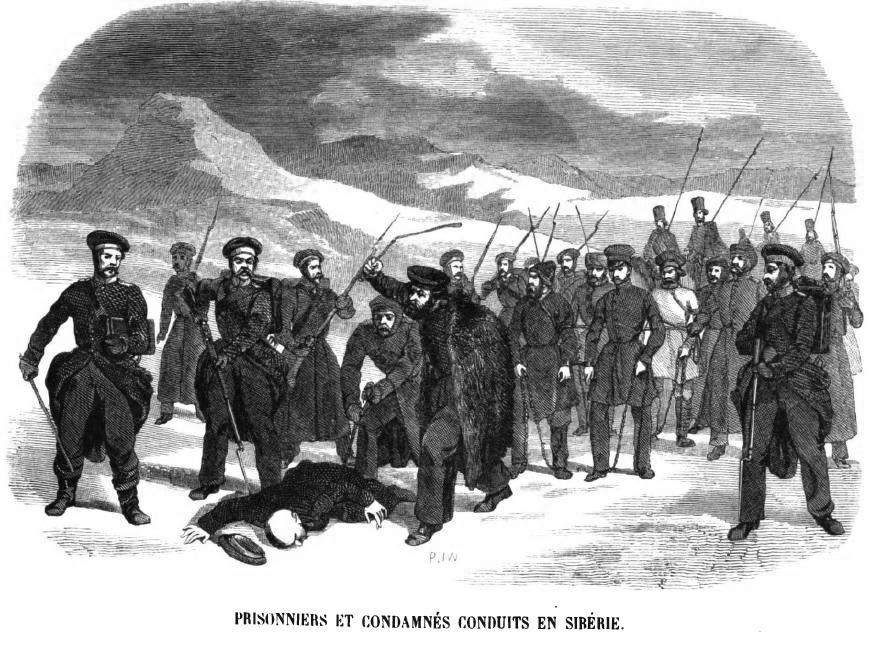
Convicts and guards on the road to Siberia, 1845

The particular use of the term "convict" in the English-speaking world was to describe the huge numbers of criminals, both male and female, who clogged British jails in the 18th and early 19th century. Their crimes would today be regarded as petty misdemeanors (stealing small items or food), or are no longer in the criminal code (such as being in unresolved debt). Most of the punishments at this time were severe, with the death penalty (hanging) applied for fairly minor crimes. However, this ultimate sentence was often commuted to a lesser one, commonly for transportation (for 7 or 14 years, or for life) to the colonies. Thus, in the British context, the term "convict" has come to refer in particular to those criminals transported overseas.

Initially many British convicts were sent to the American colonies, such as Maryland, Virginia, and Georgia, as cheap labour. The transportation of convicts from the United Kingdom began around 1615 and became increasingly common in the following years. Initially most people were transported to North America or the West Indies, but from 1718 onwards transportation was entirely to North America. The arrangements ceased when the American Revolutionary War meant it was no longer possible for the United Kingdom to send convicts to what had become the United States.

The British Government then looked to the newly discovered east coast of Australia to use as a penal colony. Convicts were transported to Australia in 1787, arriving in Botany Bay, then Sydney Cove, in January 1788. From the very start of European settlement convicts were used as indentured labourers in five out of the six colonies. Many were used on public works, but a significant number were "assigned" to private individuals as domestic servants, rural workers, etc. Transportation was progressively abolished from 1853, eventually ceasing altogether in 1868.

In Australia, convicts have come to be key figures of cultural mythology and historiography. Many became prominent businesspeople and respected citizens, and some prominent families in present-day Australian society can trace their origins to convict ancestors who rose above their humble origins. However, during the transportation era and for many years after, previous convicts and their descendants tended to hide their former criminal background, sometimes resulting in distorted or completely missing family history. Extensive and comprehensive records kept on every individual are now able to fill in the gaps; and, in fact, many family historians can find out more about their convict ancestors than they can about those who arrived in Australia as free settlers.

British convicts were also sent to Canada, West Africa, and India. France also sent convicts to New Caledonia and to Devil's Island in French Guiana.

== See also ==
- Convicted felon
- Conviction
- Convict lease
- Convict assignment
- Convicts in Australia
- Older prisoners
- Penal transportation
