= Prisoner =

Person held against their will

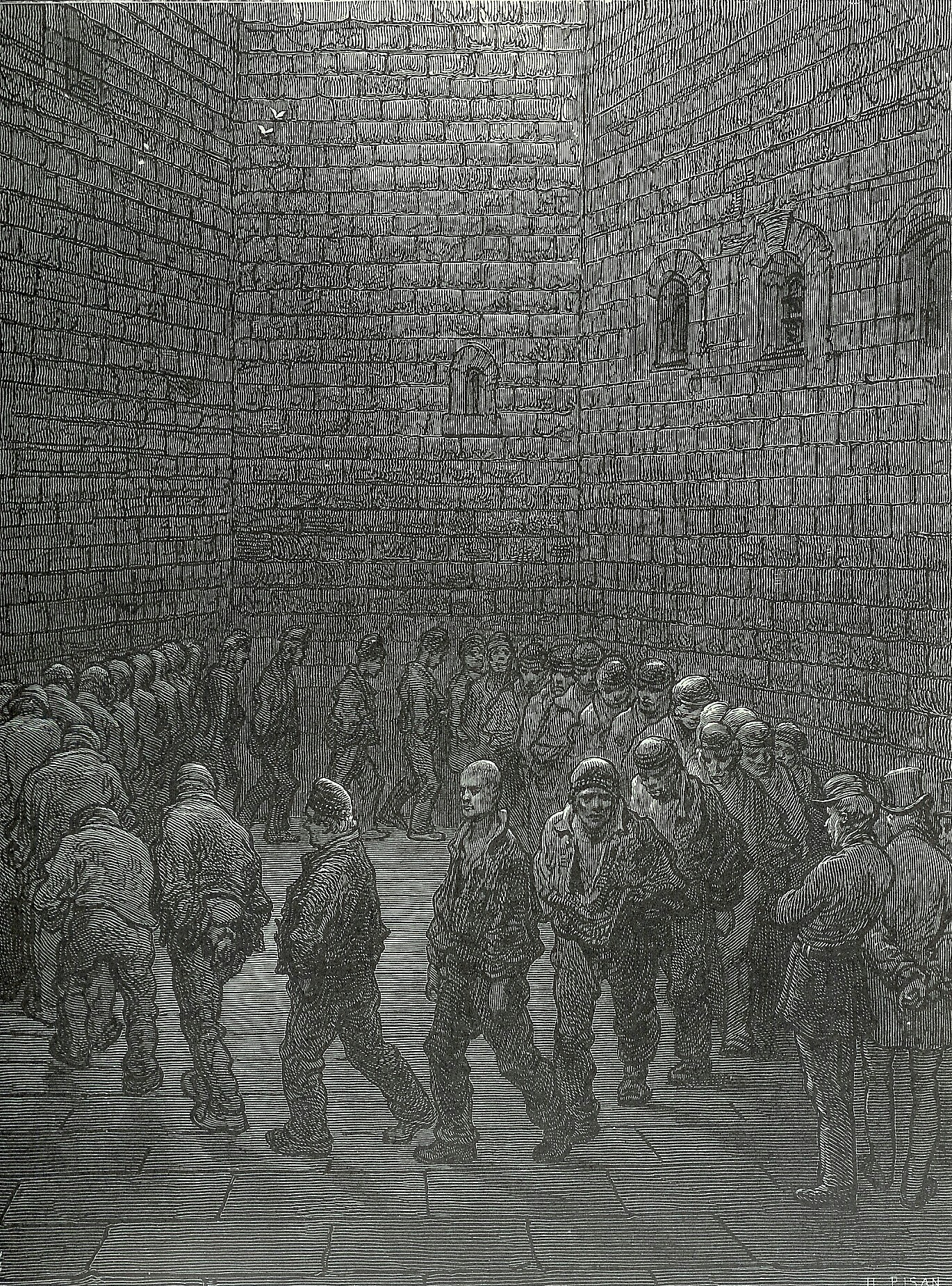
Gustave Doré's image of the exercise yard at Newgate Prison (1872)

A prisoner, also known as an inmate or detainee, is a person who is deprived of liberty against their will. This can be by confinement or captivity in a prison or physical restraint. The term usually applies to one serving a sentence in prison.

== English law ==
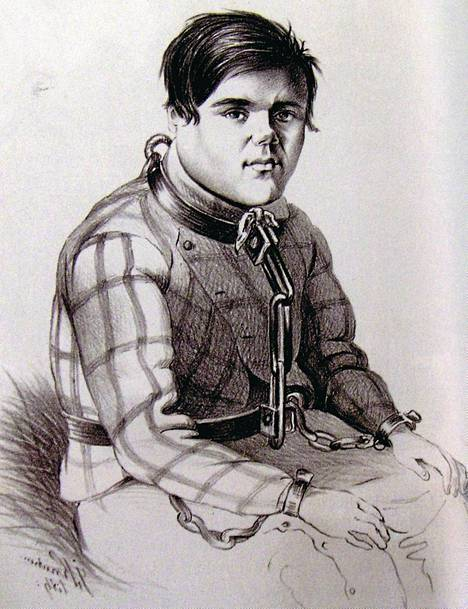
Finnish serial killer Johan Adamsson, also known as "Kerpeikkari", in the 1849 lithography by Johan Knutson while he was imprisoned

"Prisoner" is a legal term for a person who is imprisoned.

In section 1 of the Prison Security Act 1992, the word "prisoner" means any person for the time being in a prison as a result of any requirement imposed by a court or otherwise that he be detained in legal custody.

"Prisoner" was a legal term for a person prosecuted for felony. It was not applicable to a person prosecuted for misdemeanour. The abolition of the distinction between felony and misdemeanour by section 1 of the Criminal Law Act 1967 has rendered this distinction obsolete.

Glanville Williams described as "invidious" the practice of using the term "prisoner" in reference to a person who had not been convicted.

== History ==
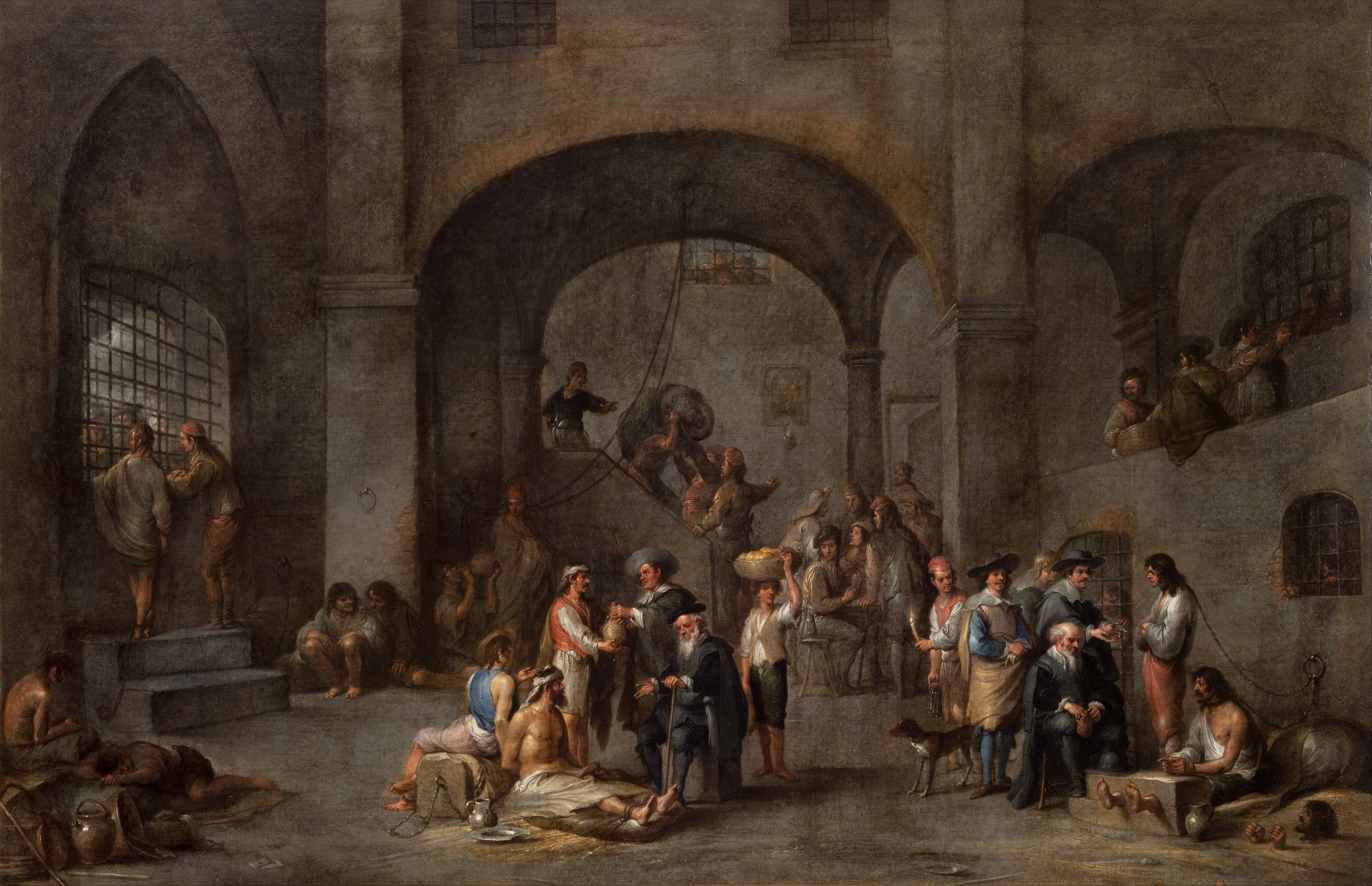
To Visit the Imprisoned by Flemish artist Cornelis de Wael c. 1640

The earliest evidence of the existence of the prisoner dates back to 8,000 BC from prehistoric graves in Lower Egypt. This evidence suggests that people from Libya enslaved a San-like tribe.

== Psychological effects ==
=== Special Housing Units (SHU) syndrome ===
Some of the most extreme adverse effects suffered by prisoners appear to be caused by solitary confinement for long durations. When held in "Special Housing Units" (SHU), prisoners are subject to sensory deprivation and lack of social contact that can have a severe negative impact on their mental health.

A psychopathological condition identified as "SHU syndrome" has been observed among such prisoners. Symptoms are characterized as problems with concentration and memory, distortions of perception, and hallucinations. Most convicts suffering from SHU syndrome exhibit extreme generalized anxiety and panic disorder, with some suffering amnesia.

The State-Trait Anxiety Inventory (STAI) was developed to understand the mechanisms behind anxiety. State anxiety describes anxiety that takes place in a stressful situation while trait anxiety is the tendency of feeling anxious in many situations because of a set of beliefs that an individual has that threatens their well-being.

SHU syndrome is a term that was created by Psychiatrist Stuart Grassian to describe the six basic mechanisms that happen in a cognitive matter in prisoners that are in solitary confinements or supermax level cell prison. The six basic mechanisms that occur together are:

- Hyperresponsivity to External Stimuli
- Perceptual Distortions
- Illusions, and Hallucinations
- Panic Attacks
- Difficulties with Thinking
- Concentration and Memory
- Intrusive Obsessional Thoughts
- Overt Paranoia

Stuart Grassian proposed that the symptoms are unique and are not found in any other situation.

Long durations may lead to depression and changes in brain physiology. In the absence of a social context that is needed to validate perceptions of their environment, prisoners become highly malleable, abnormally sensitive, and exhibit increased vulnerability to the influence of those controlling their environment. Social connection and the support provided by social interaction are prerequisites to long-term social adjustment as a prisoner.

Prisoners exhibit the paradoxical effect of social withdrawal after long periods of solitary confinement. A shift takes place from a craving for greater social contact to a fear of it. They may grow lethargic and apathetic, and no longer be able to control their own conduct when released from solitary confinement. They can come to depend upon the prison structure to control and limit their conduct.

Long-term stays in solitary confinement can cause prisoners to develop clinical depression, and long-term impulse control disorder. Those with pre-existing mental illnesses are at a higher risk for developing psychiatric symptoms. Some common behaviours are self-mutilation, suicidal tendencies, and psychosis.

=== Stockholm syndrome ===
The psychological syndrome known as Stockholm syndrome describes a paradoxical phenomenon where, over time, hostages develop positive feelings towards their captors. The victim's ego develops a series of defense mechanisms to achieve survival and cope with stress in a traumatic situation.

== Inmate culture ==
The founding of ethnographic prison sociology as a discipline, from which most of the meaningful knowledge of prison life and culture stems, is commonly credited to the publication of two key texts: Donald Clemmer's The Prison Community, which was first published in 1940 and republished in 1958; and Gresham Sykes classic study The Society of Captives, which was also published in 1958. Clemmer's text, based on his study of 2,400 convicts over three years at the Menard Correctional Center where he worked as a clinical sociologist, propagated the notion of the existence of a distinct inmate culture and society with values and norms antithetical to both the prison authority and the wider society.

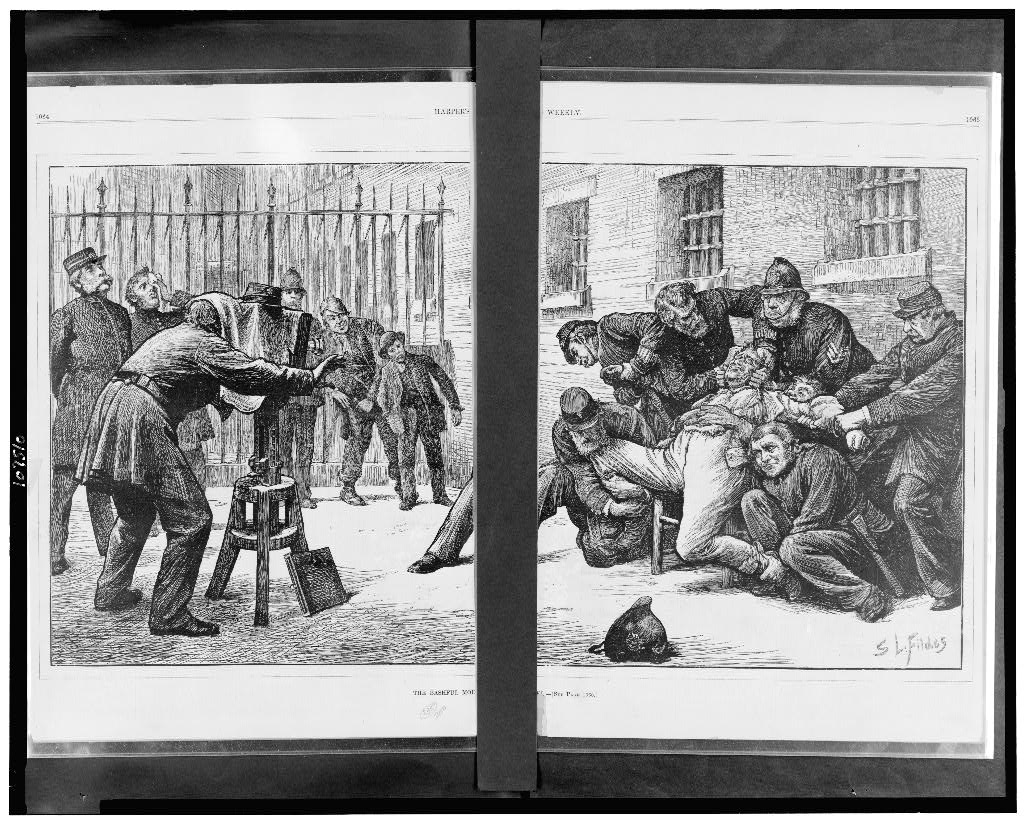
A scene in Newgate Prison, London

In this world, for Clemmer, these values, formalized as the "inmate code", provided behavioural precepts that unified prisoners and fostered antagonism to prison officers and the prison institution as a whole. The process whereby inmates acquired this set of values and behavioural guidelines as they adapted to prison life he termed "prisonization", which he defined as the "taking on, in a greater or lesser degree, the folkways, mores, customs and general culture of the penitentiary". However, while Clemmer argued that all prisoners experienced some degree of "prisonization" this was not a uniform process and factors such as the extent to which a prisoner involved himself in primary group relations in the prison and the degree to which he identified with the external society all had a considerable impact.

"Prisonization" as the inculcation of a convict culture was defined by identification with primary groups in prison, the use of prison slang and argot, the adoption of specified rituals and a hostility to prison authority in contrast to inmate solidarity and was asserted by Clemmer to create individuals who were acculturated into a criminal and deviant way of life that stymied all attempts to reform their behaviour.

Opposed to these theories, several European sociologists have shown that inmates were often fragmented and the links they have with society are often stronger than those forged in prison, particularly through the action of work on time perception

=== Convict code ===
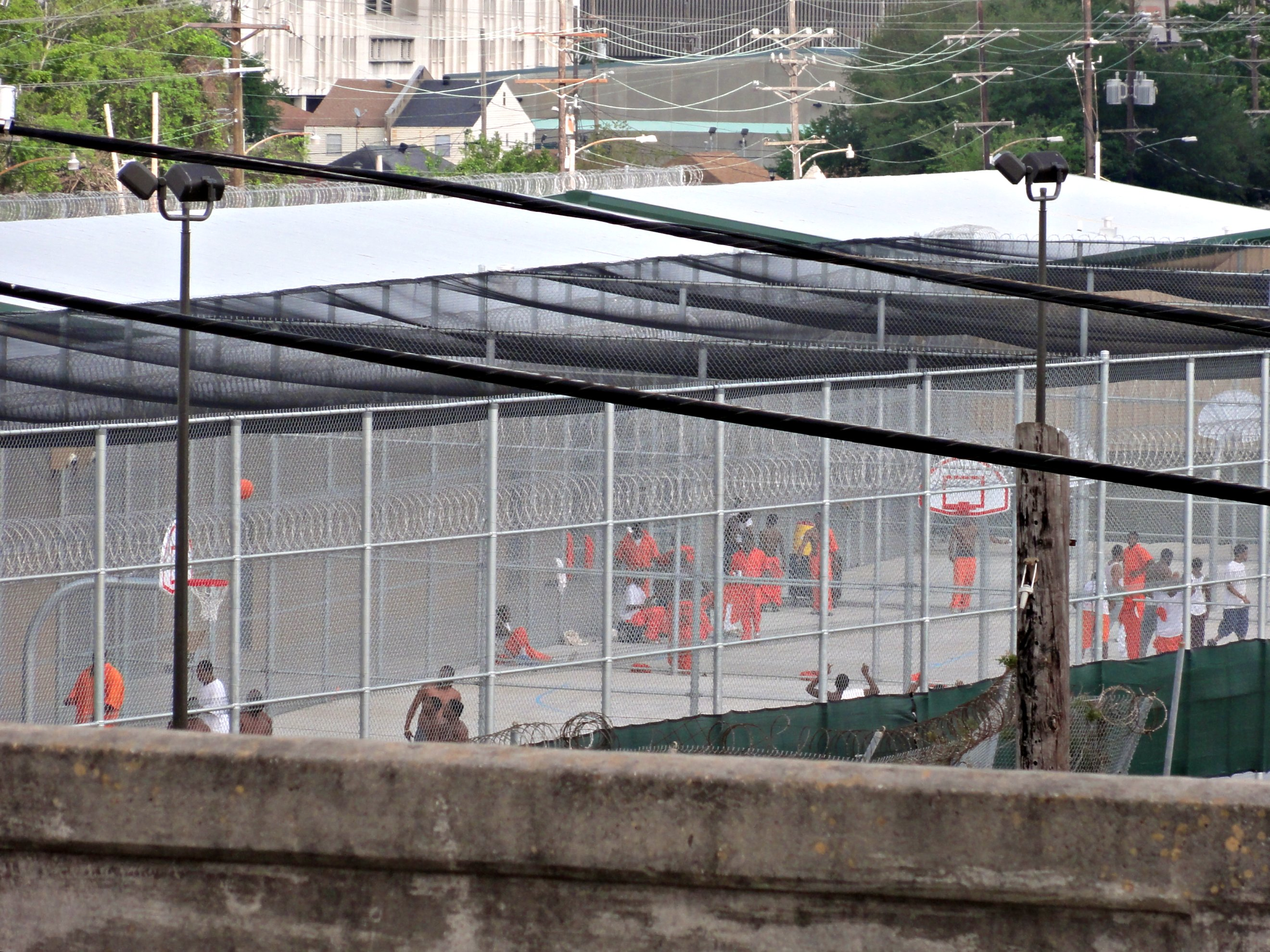
Inmates in a prison yard

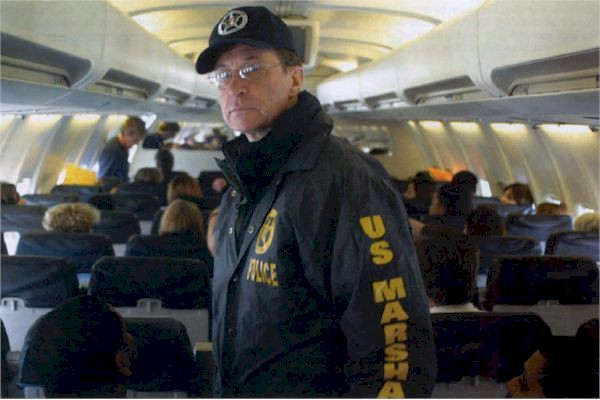
US Marshals and prisoners on board a Con Air flight

The convict code was theorized as a set of tacit behavioural norms which exercised a pervasive impact on the conduct of prisoners. Competency in following the routines demanded by the code partly determined the inmate's identity as a convict. As a set of values and behavioural guidelines, the convict code referred to the behaviour of inmates in antagonising staff members and to the mutual solidarity between inmates as well as the tendency to the non-disclosure to prison authorities of prisoner activities and to resistance to rehabilitation programmer. Thus, it was seen as providing an expression and form of communal resistance and allowed for the psychological survival of the individual under extremely repressive and regimented systems of carceral control.

Sykes outlined some of the most salient points of this code as it applied in the post-war period in the United States:

- Don't interfere with inmate interests.
- Never rat on a con.
- Don't be nosy.
- Keep off a man's back.
- Don't put a guy on the spot.
- Be loyal to your class.
- Be cool.
- Do your own time.
- Don't bring heat.
- Don't exploit inmates.
- Don't cop out.
- Be tough.
- Be wary, and try to be a man.
- Never talk to a screw.
- Have a connection.
- Be sharp.

== Rights ==
=== United States ===
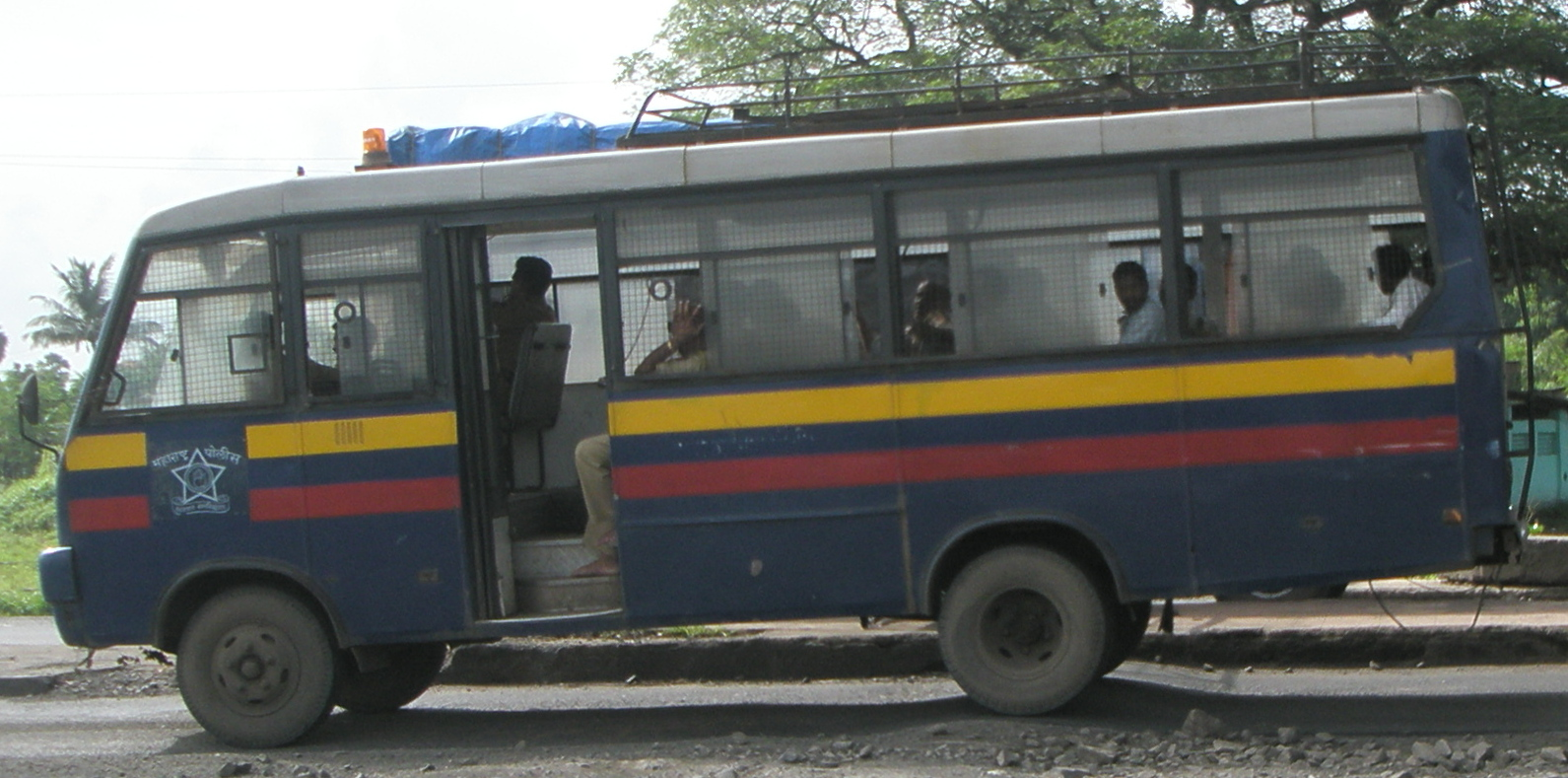
A police bus used by the Maharashtra Police in Mumbai, India

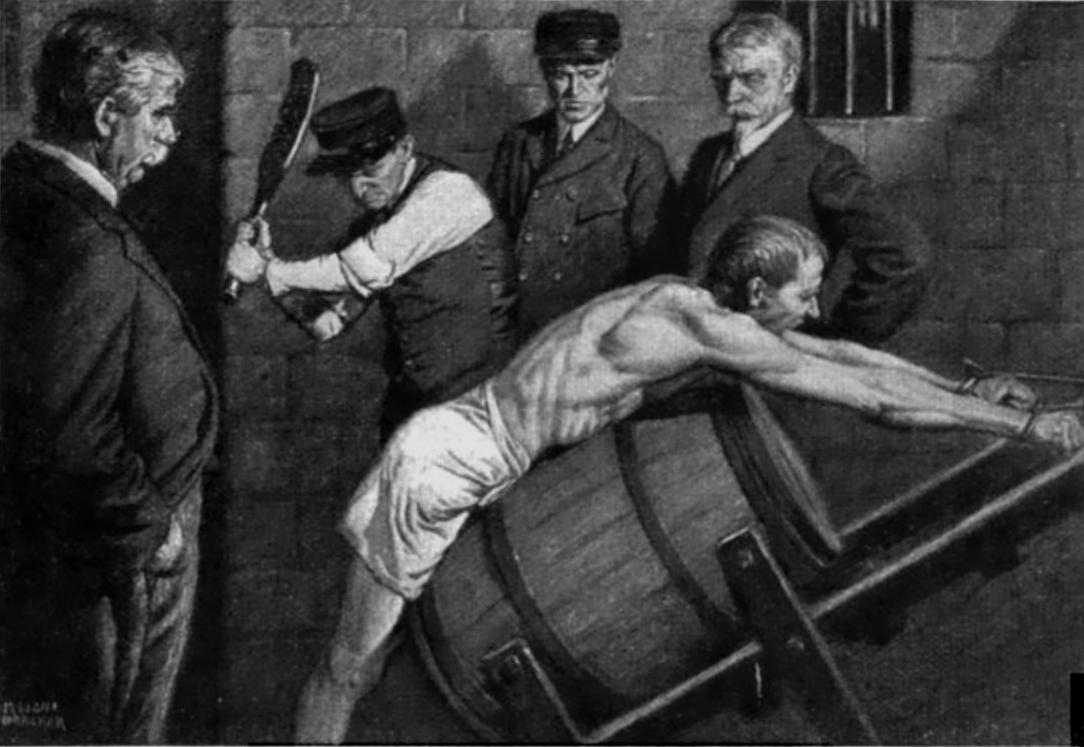
1912 illustration of an inmate being punished in an American prison

Both federal and state laws govern the rights of prisoners. Prisoners in the United States do not have full rights under the Constitution, however, they are protected by the Eighth Amendment which prohibits cruel and unusual punishment. However, the mass incarcerations in the United States prisons raise concerns about the 8th Amendment being overridden by these conditions.

Growing research associates education with a number of positive outcomes for prisoners, the institution, and society. Although at the time of the ban's enactment there was limited knowledge about the relationship between education and recidivism, there is growing merit to idea that education in prison is a preventative to re-incarceration. Several studies help illustrate the point. For example, one study in 1997 that focused on 3,200 prisoners in Maryland, Minnesota, and Ohio, showed that prison education reduced the likelihood of re-incarceration by 29 percent. In 2000, the Texas Department of Education conducted a longitudinal study of 883 men and women who earned college degrees while incarcerated, finding recidivism rates between 27.2 percent (completion of an AA degree) and 7.8 percent (completion of a BA degree), compared to a system-wide recidivism rate between 40 and 43 percent.10 One report, sponsored by the Correctional Education Association, focused on recidivism in three states, concluding that education prevented crime. More recently, a 2013 Department of Justice funded study from the RAND Corporation found that incarcerated individuals who participated in correctional education were 43% less likely to return to prison within 3 years than prisoners who did not participate in such programmes. The research implies that education has the potential to impact recidivism rates positively by lowering them.

Unsentenced detainees as a proportion of overall prison population, 2023

== Types ==
- Civilian internees are civilians who are detained by a party to a war for security reasons. They can either be friendly, neutral, or enemy nationals.
- Convicts are prisoners that are incarcerated under the legal system. In the United States, a federal inmate or a felon, is a person convicted of violating federal law, who is then incarcerated at a federal prison that exclusively houses similar criminals. The term most often applies to those convicted of a felony.
- Detainees is a frequent term used by certain governments to refer to individuals who are held in custody and are not liable to be classified and treated under the law as either prisoners of war or suspects in criminal cases. It is generally defined with the broad definition: "someone held in custody".
- Hostages are historically defined as prisoners held as security for the fulfillment of an agreement, or as a deterrent against an act of war. In modern times, it refers to someone who is seized by a criminal abductor.
- Prisoners of war, also known as a POWs, are individuals incarcerated in relation to wars. They can be either civilians affiliated with combatants, or combatants acting within the bounds of the laws and customs of war.
- Political prisoners describe those imprisoned for participation or connection to political activity. Such inmates challenge the legitimacy of the detention.
- Slaves are prisoners that are illegally held captive for their use as illegal laborers. Various methods have been used throughout history to deprive slaves of their liberty, including forcible restraint, which is illegal.
- Prisoner of conscience are anyone imprisoned because of their race, sexual orientation, religion, or political views.

Other types of prisoners can include those under police custody, house arrest, those in psychiatric institutions, internment camps, and peoples restricted to a specific area.

== See also ==
- Arbitrary arrest and detention
- Books to Prisoners
- Detention
- Detention of suspects
- History of United States Prison Systems
- House arrest
- Human rights
- Incarceration
- Independent custody visitor
- Judicial corporal punishment
- List of countries by incarceration rate
- Older prisoners
- Prisoner support
- Prisoner's dilemma
- Prisoners' rights
- Prison uniform
