= Societal effects of negligible senescence =

Hypothetical scenario of minimal mortality in humans

The societal effects of negligible senescence consider a scenario where negligible senescence is achieved on a societal wide level in humans. There is much controversy about the realistic timeline of such a scenario. The predictions vary in time starting from 2037 till later than the 21st century. The effects of negligible senescence will have a profound impact on the economy, climate, demographics, and social structures. The baseline scenario ceteris paribus of negligible senescence is more population growth while a larger healthier labor force would spur economic growth.

== Definition and characteristics ==
Senescence is defined as the gradual deterioration of functional characteristics in living organisms. The word senescence can either refer to cellular senescence or to the senescence of a whole organism. Negligible senescence is therefore defined as the lack of senescence or a very small amount of senescence, which implies that mortality and morbidity from most causes is eliminated. The term was introduced by biogerentologist Caleb Finch to denote organisms that do not exhibit evidence of biological aging and was further popularized by gerontologist Aubrey de Grey.

=== Proximity of a negligible senescence society ===
The timeline wherein humanity will achieve a negligible senescence scenario is unclear. For instance, in the Worldbank projections of demographics until 2050 death rate per 1,000 is increasing year-on-year thus implying no projection of negligible senescence before 2050. Although visionaries like Yuval Noah Harari do mention the possibility of a negligible senescence society, Noah also remarks that he does not think that this is likely to happen in the 21st century. Only a few people have publicly announced that they deem negligible senescence likely in the 21st century, including Aubrey de Grey, founder of the SENS Research Foundation.

== Societal impact ==
=== Demographics ===
That negligible senescence will have a great impact on worldwide demographics is widely accepted. Coale noted that a shift toward near-immortality would have the same long-term impact on population growth as a 10% increase in the fertility rate. As the death rate per thousand people will drop from roughly 10 per thousand (1% per year) to near zero, this would add an extra 1% population growth each year.

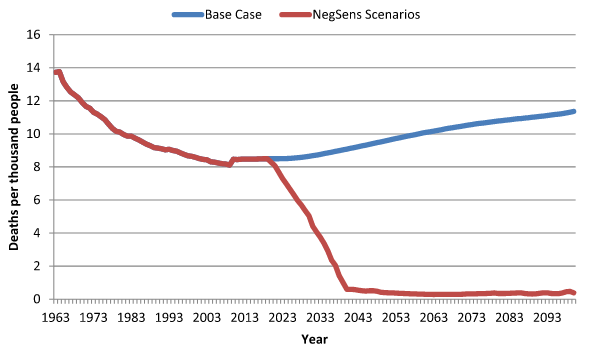
Death rate per 1,000 people

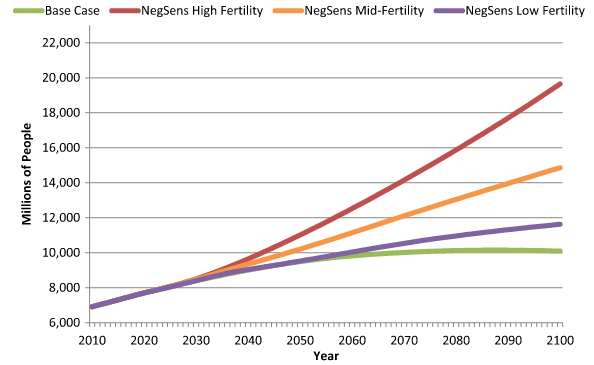
Different scenarios of world population without senescence

Although aging populations in population pyramids result in "constructive" pyramids which are narrowed at the bottom, this might not necessarily be the case in the aging population in a negligible senescence scenario. Depending on the total fertility rate, all three different shapes of population pyramids can be observed.

Many questions still remain regarding demographic predictions in negligible senescence scenarios. The total fertility rate has steadily decreased from 5 in 1950–1955 to around 2.5 in 2010–2015. The impact of negligible senescence on the future total fertility rate is unclear as there might be a reduced sense of self-"replacement". However, this might be offset by the elimination of biological limitations on child-rearing (delay or complete eradication of menopause) which in turn may or may not occur with negligible senescence. Furthermore, the age of mothers might increase or stay stable depending on a myriad of factors, thus impacting the total fertility rate.

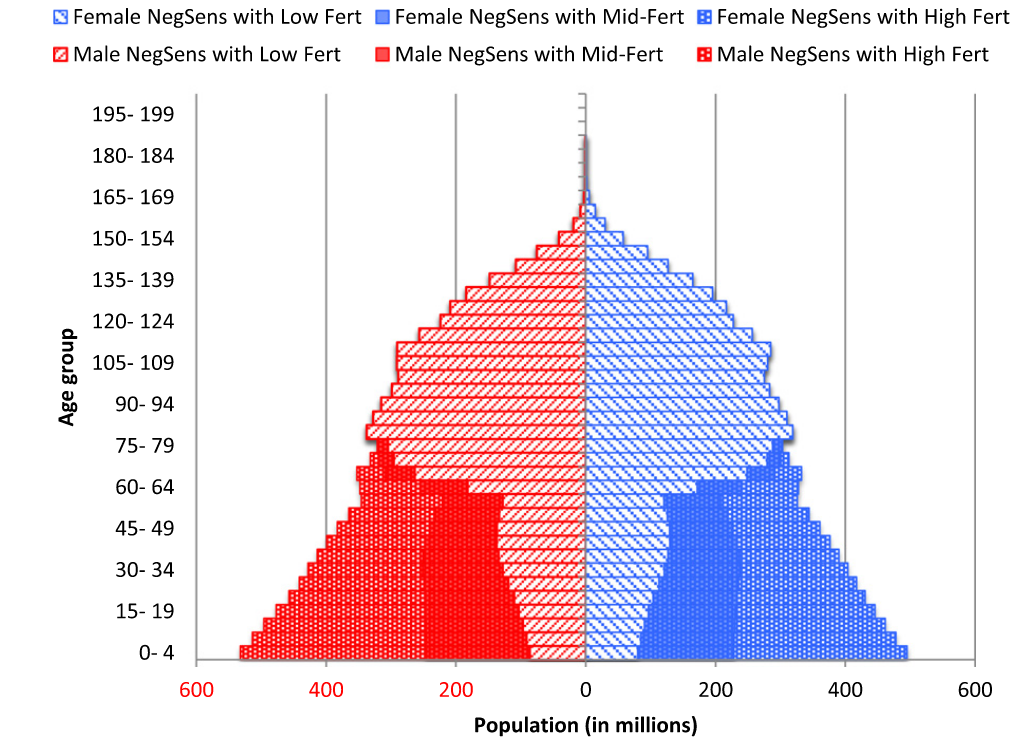
Different shapes of population pyramids

=== Economics ===
The impact of negligible senescence on the economy is multi-faceted. Many developed countries face population ageing due to demographic transition, whereas in the least developed countries, people of old age only comprise a small part of the total population. Therefore, the development of negligible senescence therapies have profoundly different effects on the economies of countries with different demographic characteristics. From a worldwide perspective, eliminating senescence has a massive effect on the economy. As current productivity losses for employers in the U.S. alone is calculated at 225.8 billion annually, the impact can be large. Furthermore, changes in pension plans might enable unlimited perpetual productivity after childhood ceteris paribus and thus eliminating the 'aged dependency ratio' in the equation of dependency ratios. These effects are partly offset with the costs of providing negligible senescence therapies.

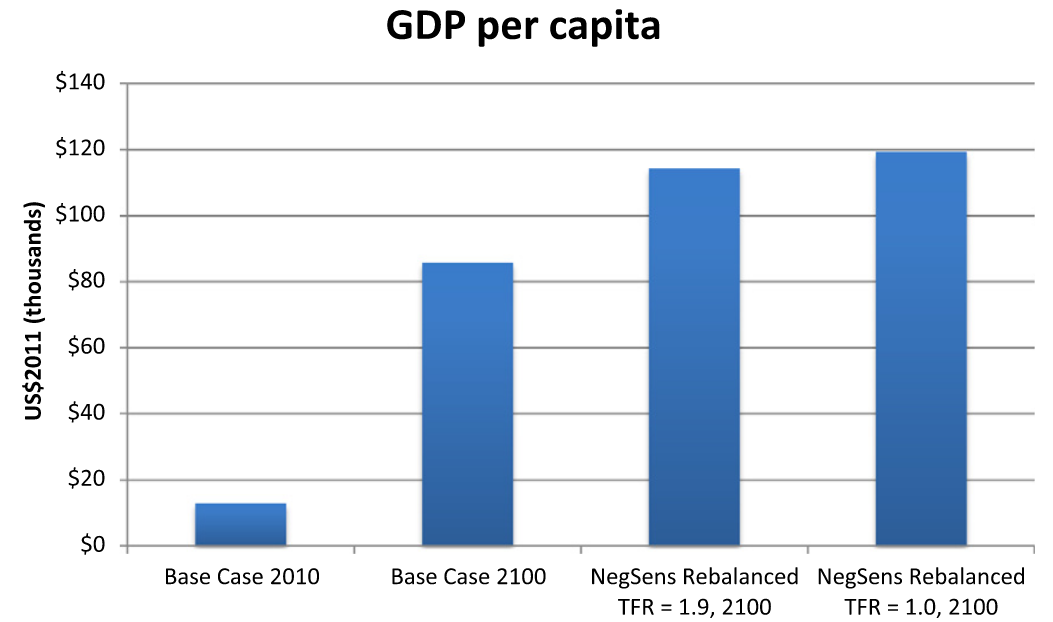
GDP and GDP per capita in 2100 in the base case and minimal senescence scenario

=== Life in a negligible senescence society ===
As philosopher Nick Bostrom mentioned in his story "The Fable of the Dragon-Tyrant" referring to the end of senescence: "And in the coming days... I believe we have some reorganization to do!". Humankind has experienced senescence for all its history. Therefore, major challenges are necessarily to fill the void the lack of senescence has now left behind. However, he does not substantiate this any further into practical measures.

== See also ==
- Timeline of senescence research
- Aging brain
- Pro-aging trance
- Longevity escape velocity
