= Disengagement theory =

Theory of aging

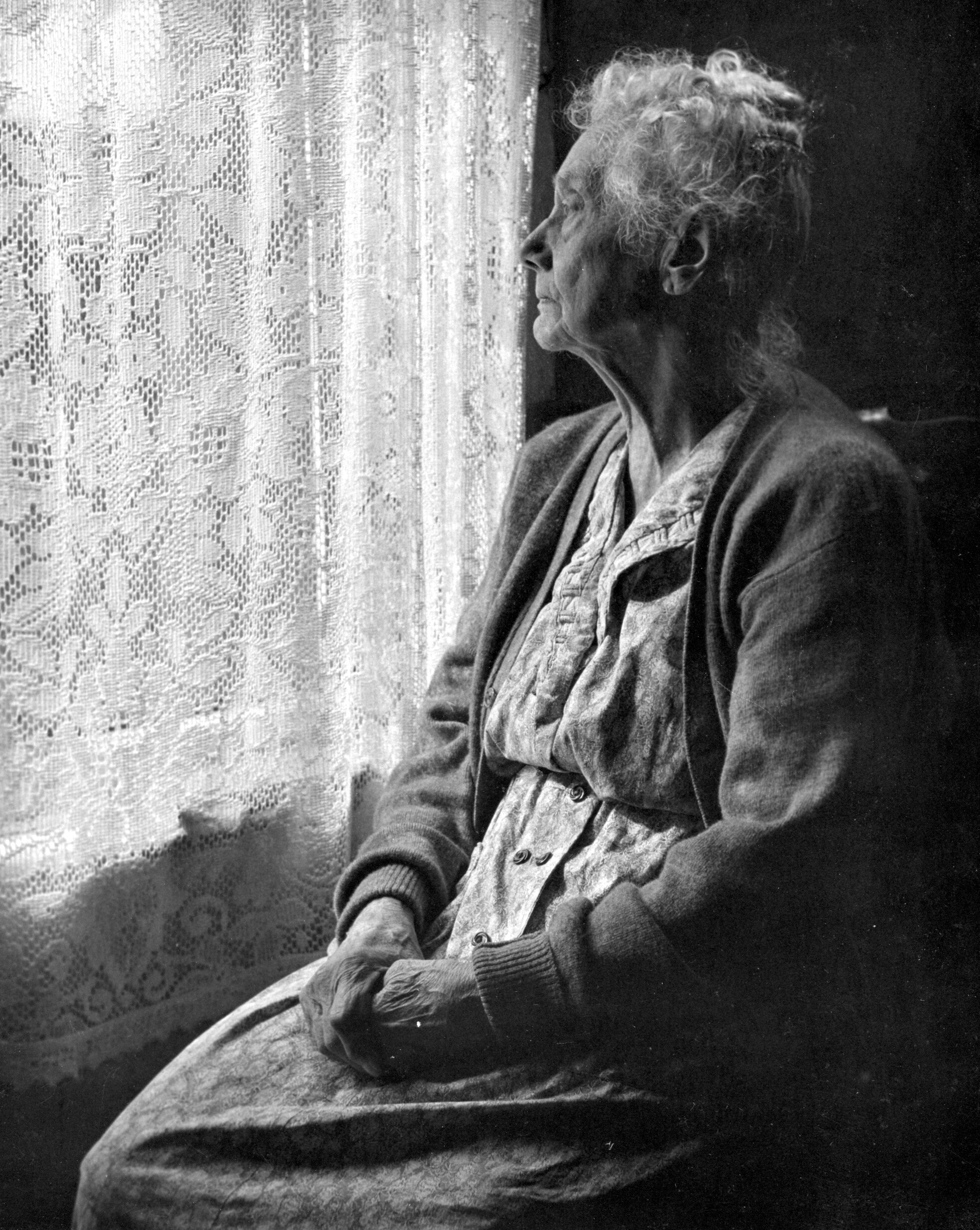
The disengagement theory states that older adults withdraw from personal relationships and society as they age.

The disengagement theory of ageing states that "aging is an inevitable, mutual withdrawal or disengagement, resulting in decreased interaction between the aging person and others in the social system he belongs to". The theory claims that it is natural and acceptable for older adults to withdraw from society. It also claims that the individual separates from their roles in society as a form of freedom. As people age they lose their social ties and adjust their goals. They might prioritize health goals over professional goals, to adjust to age. This is known as goal disengagement. There are other variations of disengagement theory, such as moral disengagement.

Disengagement theory was formulated by Cumming and Henry in 1961 in the book Growing Old and was the first theory of aging that social scientists developed. The theory was based on their Kansas City Study of Adult Life and focused on social changes and attitude changes. All 211 adults included were between the ages of 50 and 90. Thus, the theory has historical significance in gerontology. Since then, it has faced strong criticism since the disengagement process was proposed as innate, universal, unidirectional, and continuous once it begins Cumming has since revisited the theory in her "Further Thoughts on the Theory of Disengagement" in 1963.

The disengagement theory is one of three major psychosocial theories which describe how people develop in old age. The other two major psychosocial theories are the activity theory and the continuity theory, and the disengagement theory comes to odds with both.

== Postulates ==
Cumming and Henry provided the following nine postulates for the "process of disengagement":

- Postulate 1: Everyone expects death, and one's abilities will likely deteriorate over time. As a result, every person will lose ties to others in his or her society.
- Postulate 2: Because individual interactions between people strengthen norms, an individual who has fewer varieties of interactions has greater freedom from the norms imposed by interaction. Consequently, this form of disengagement becomes a circular or self-perpetuating process.
- Postulate 3: Because men have a centrally instrumental role in America, and women a socioemotional one, disengagement differs between men and women.
- Postulate 4: The individual's life is punctuated by ego changes. For example, aging, a form of ego change, causes knowledge and skill to deteriorate. However, success in an industrialized society demands certain knowledge and skill. To satisfy these demands, age-grading ensures that the young possess sufficient knowledge and skill to assume authority and the old retire before they lose their skills. This kind of disengagement is affected by the individual, prompted by either ego changes or the organization—which is bound to organizational imperatives—or both.
- Postulate 5: When both the individual and society are ready for disengagement, complete disengagement results. When neither is ready, continuing engagement results. When the individual is ready and society is not, a disjunction between the expectations of the individual and of the members of this social systems results, but engagement usually continues. When society is ready and the individual is not, the result of the disjunction is usually disengagement.
- Postulate 6: Man's central role is work, and woman's is marriage and family. If individuals abandon their central roles, they drastically lose social life space, and so suffer crisis and demoralization unless they assume the different roles required by the disengaged state.
- Postulate 7: This postulate contains two main concepts.
  - (a) Readiness for disengagement occurs if:
    - An individual is aware of the shortness of life and scarcity of time.
    - Individuals perceive their life space decreasing.
    - A person loses ego energy.
  - (b) Each level of society grants individuals permission to disengage because of the following:
    - Requirements of the rational-legal occupational system in an affluent society
    - The nature of the nuclear family
    - The differential death rate
- Postulate 8: Fewer interactions and disengagement from central roles lead to the relationships in the remaining roles changing. In turn, relational rewards become more diverse, and vertical solidarities are transformed to horizontal ones.
- Postulate 9: Disengagement theory is independent of culture, but the form it takes is bound by culture.

== See also ==
- Aging
- Activity theory
- Continuity theory
