= Continuity theory =

Psychosocial theory of aging

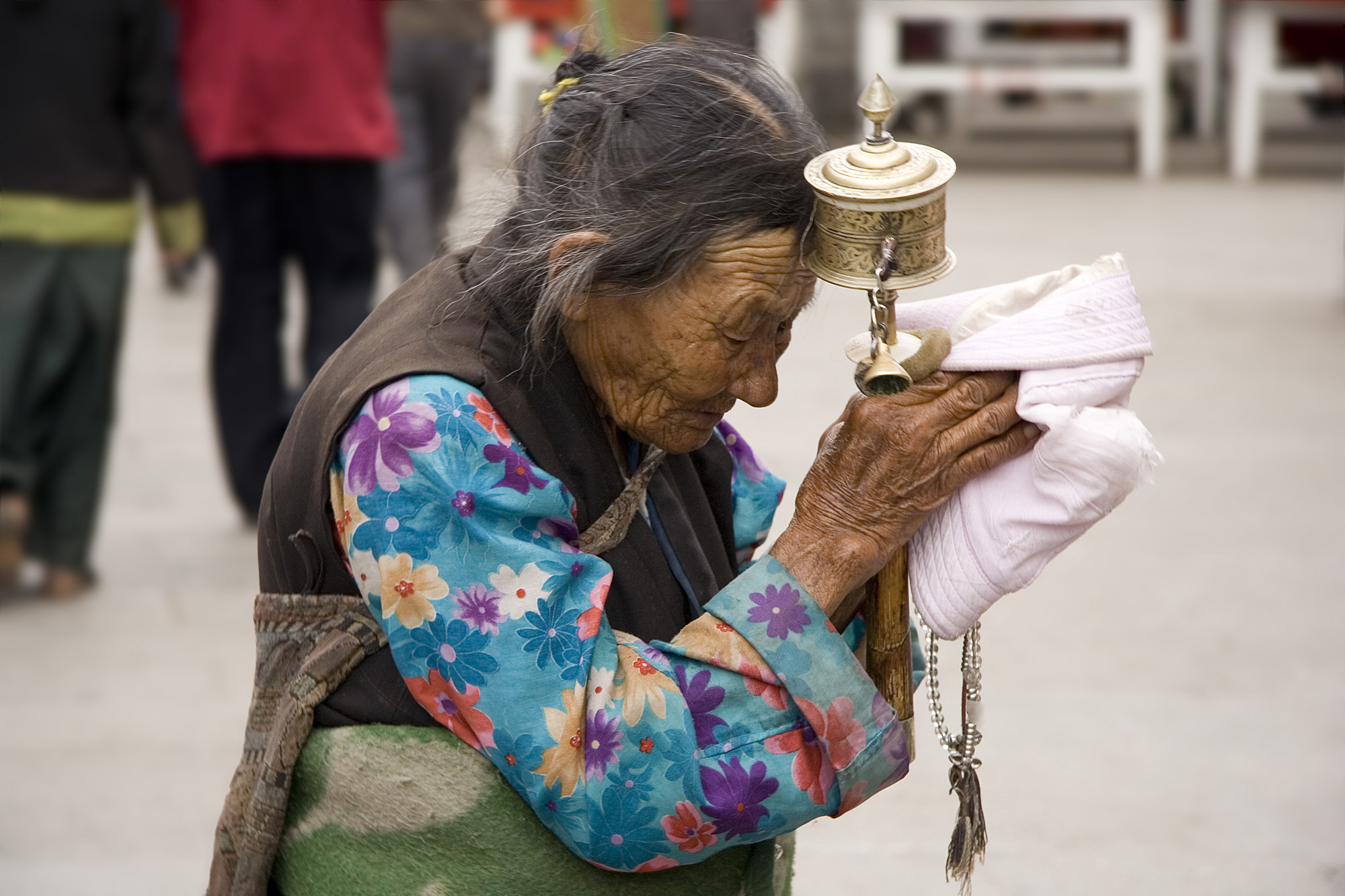
An elderly Tibetan woman holding a prayer wheel demonstrates the continuity theory. Despite their age, older adults generally maintain the same traditions and beliefs.

The continuity theory of normal aging states that older adults will usually maintain the same activities, behaviors, relationships as they did in their earlier years of life. According to this theory, older adults try to maintain this continuity of lifestyle by adapting strategies that are connected to their past experiences.

The continuity theory is one of three major psychosocial theories which describe how people develop in old age. The other two psychosocial theories are the disengagement theory, with which the continuity theory comes to odds, and the activity theory upon which the continuity theory modifies and elaborates. Unlike the other two theories, the continuity theory uses a life course perspective to define normal aging.

The continuity theory can be classified as a micro-level theory because it pertains to the individual, and more specifically it can be viewed from the functionalist perspective

== History ==
The continuity theory originated in the observation that a large proportion of older adults show consistency in their activities, personalities, and relationships despite their changing physical, mental, and social status. In 1968, George L. Maddox gave an empirical description of the theory in a chapter of the book Middle Age and Aging: A Reader in Social Psychology called "Persistence of life style among the elderly: A longitudinal study of patterns of social activity in relation to life satisfaction". The continuity theory was formerly proposed in 1971 by Robert Atchley in his article "Retirement and Leisure Participation: Continuity or Crisis?" in the journal The Gerontologist. Later, in 1989, he published another article entitled "A Continuity Theory of Normal Aging", in The Gerontologist in which he substantially developed the theory. In this article, he expanded the continuity theory to explain the development of internal and external structures of continuity. In 1999, Robert Atchley continued to strengthen his theory in his book Continuity and Adaptation in Aging: Creating Positive Experiences.

== Elements ==
The theory deals with the internal structure and the external structure of continuity to describe how people adapt to their situation and set their goals. The internal structure of an individual such as personality, ideas, and beliefs remain constant throughout the life course. This provides the individual a way to make future decisions based on their internal foundation of the past. The external structure of an individual such as relationships and social roles provides a support for maintaining a stable self-concept and lifestyle.

== Criticisms and weaknesses ==
The major criticism for the theory is its definition of normal aging. The theory distinguishes normal aging from pathological aging, neglecting the older adults with chronic illness.

The feminist theories criticise the continuity theory for defining normal aging around a male model.

Another weakness of the theory is that it fails to demonstrate how social institutions impact the individuals and the way they age.

== See also ==
- Aging
- Activity theory (aging)
- Disengagement theory
