= Activity theory (aging) =

Theory of aging

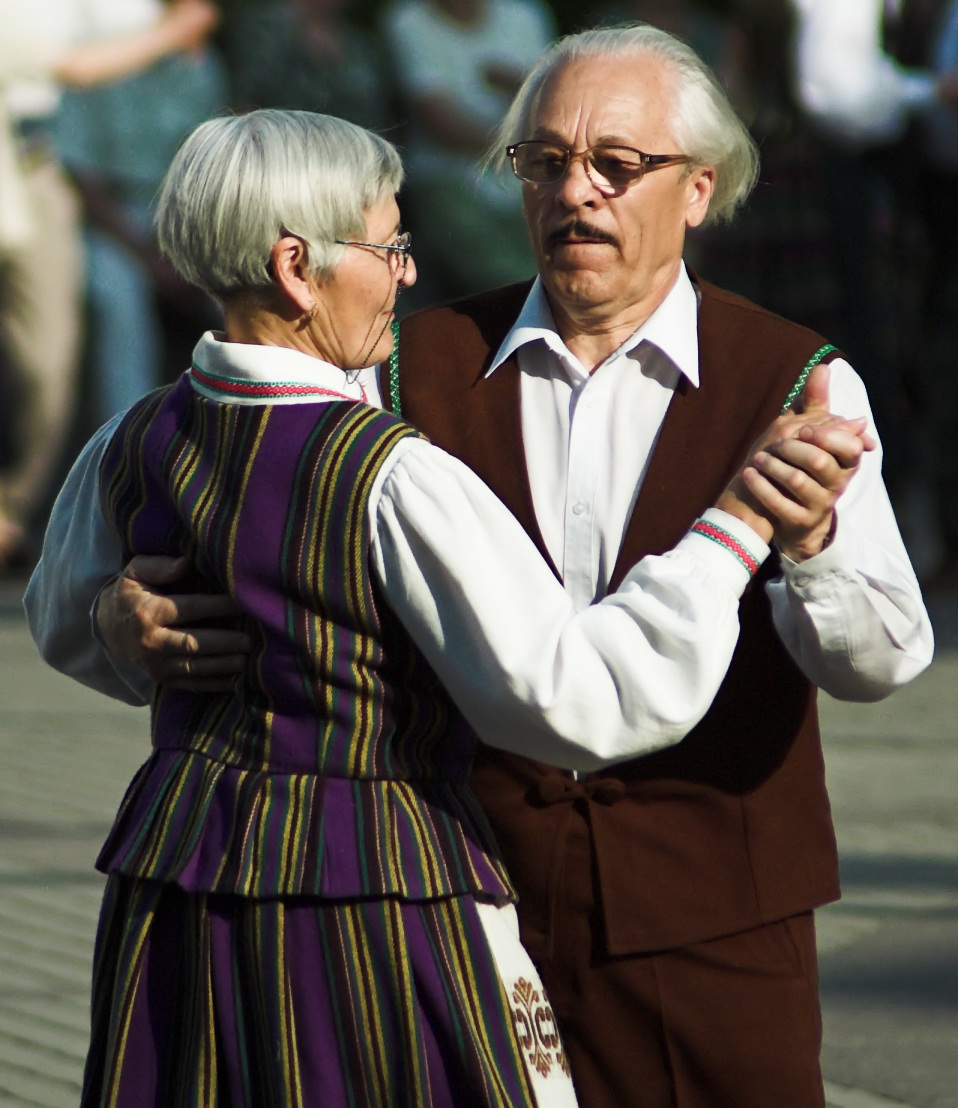
Two older adults dancing. The activity theory states that optimal aging occurs when individuals participate in activities, pursuits, and relationships.

The activity theory of aging, also known as the implicit theory of aging, normal theory of aging, and lay theory of aging, proposes that aging occurs with more positive outcomes when adults stay active and maintain social interactions as they get older. Activity theory suggests that the aging process is slowed or delayed, and quality of life is enhanced when the elderly remain socially active (attending or hosting events or pursuits that bring members of a community together to interact with each other). Book clubs, club sports, barbeques, volunteer work, fitness classes, brunch dates, holiday celebrations and protests are just a few examples of how people maintain a healthy social life, which the activity theory of aging reports contributes to overall health in later life.

The theory assumes a positive relationship between activity and life satisfaction. One author suggests that activity enables older adults to adjust to retirement in a more seamless and less stressful fashion. This is coined as "the busy ethic".

Activity theory reflects the functionalist perspective that argues the equilibrium an individual develops in middle age should be maintained in later years. The theory predicts that older adults that face role loss will substitute former roles with other alternatives.

The activity theory is one of three major psychosocial theories which describe how people develop in old age. The other two psychosocial theories are the disengagement theory, with which the activity comes to odds, and the continuity theory which modifies and elaborates upon the activity theory.

Though in recent years the acceptance activity theory has diminished, it is still used as a standard to compare observed activity and life satisfaction patterns.

== History ==
The activity theory rose in opposing response to the disengagement theory. The activity theory and the disengagement theory were the two major theories that outlined successful aging in the early 1960s. The theory was developed by Robert J. Havighurst in 1961. In 1964, Bernice Neugarten asserted that satisfaction in old age depended on active maintenance of personal relationships and endeavors.

== In social science research ==
The activity theory has been found useful in various qualitative and quantitative research settings, with social scientists exploring the impact of activity on aspects of the aging life.

Historically, activity participation among aging populations has been well explained in research, yet the interaction of determinants like personality and health are seldom included. One quantitative study aimed to fill this gap by analyzing the effects of extraverted personality on aging activity levels through addressing its interaction with physical and mental health. Through a series of telephone interviews in Hong Kong, China, a sample of 304 adults over the age of 50 were surveyed on perceived physical and mental health, level of extraversion, and level of activity. The associations between activity level and each variable were examined by comparing results with low, moderate, and high activity levels of extraverted individuals. Findings of this study reveal that there is a strong, positive correlation between extraversion and activity level, with participants indicating that a high activity level was most likely paired with the perception of good mental and physical health.

Another study analyzed the aging population's ability to "describe a friend" by utilizing the theory of mind, which describes an individual's capacity to understand other people by ascribing mental states to them. This research aimed to investigate the relationship between activity level, older people's social relationships, and their associated theory of mind. 72 participants aged 60–79 from northern Italy were recruited to describe their best friend, with stories being transcribed and coded based on the level of detailed vocabulary used. This was followed with a questionnaire that examined the participants' activity level and cognitive functioning. Findings revealed that, although data was variable among the sample group, there was a slight positive correlation between high activity level, high affinity to social relationships, and ability to utilize theory of mind.

A different qualitative study aimed to investigate the impact of an intergenerational exchange between undergraduate students and nursing home residents on the social engagement and self-esteem of the elderly. 13 older adult participants residing in an assisted living community in the rural Rocky Mountains were surveyed about their preferences of entertainment from childhood. From this survey, undergraduate researchers chose and viewed two movies with their paired participants. Nursing home residents were then interviewed about their level of enjoyment or disdain from the movie-viewing experience. Results of this study show a positive correlation among meaningful intergenerational exchanges, use of activity theory, and social engagement in the aging population.

== As You Age ==
As people grow in age, most experience declines in their physical abilities such as strength, balance, flexibility, and endurance as well as a decline in their mental health. Cognitive functioning is also heavily impacted, most older adults experience reduced ability to focus, slower information processing, and in some cases some experience severe depression and anxiety. (Freund & Riediger, 2003) There are many factors that contribute to successful aging and maintaining a lifestyle you enjoy even as you age and lose some of your abilities. Factors such as not smoking, good diet, regular physical activity, moderate alcohol consumption, and strong work support are important pieces that fit into the puzzle of successful aging. (Britton et al., 2008)

== Social Relationships and Integration ==
One factor that is often neglected is the importance of having a supportive and comforting network of friends, family and community. Research shows having strong and supportive social relationships improves psychological well-being as well as slow down cognitive and functional losses. (Adams & Blieszner, 1995) This shows that successful aging depends as much on social integration as it does on other factors like physical health behaviors. Older adults who immerse themselves in their community to maintain meaningful relations and lean into their supportive networks when needed are more likely to report a higher life satisfaction rate, they tend to experience lower rates of depression, slower cognitive decline, and better resilience in the face of physical health challenges. (Adams & Blieszner, 1995)

== Loneliness and Cognitive Outcomes ==
On the other hand, loneliness has been one of the strongest predictors of a lower life satisfaction rate, older adults who report feeling isolated and alone are more likely to experience accelerated cognitive declines and increased chances of depression and other mental illnesses. (Sharma, 2020) Although living alone is associated with reduced quality of life and lower life satisfaction rate, being married or maintaining close ties with children strongly predicts better outcomes in both cognition and emotional well-being. (Adams & Blieszner, 1995) As briefly mentioned in activity theory, "staying busy" is not enough. You can work all day long and be busy and still feel unsatisfied in the end. True resilience from aging comes not from activity alone but from activities rooted in genuine human connections, the quality of the relationships and the presence of having a supportive community is more important than keeping "a busy life". It's important to have access to supportive communities like family, friends and faith-based groups because they provide a sense of belonging and purpose. Having close ties and meaningful connections with people are important to have an enjoyable life.

== Intergenerational Spaces ==
There are many ways older adults can make connections and build meaningful relationships, one way is to get out there and participate in leisure activities, studies show participating in social, cultural or physical activities has been linked to better physiological well-being and reduced depression. (Sharma, 2020) Older adults can partake in activities such as volunteering, attending events within their community, starting new hobbies and meeting people with different backgrounds and stories can be a great way to create meaning and purpose. (Reichstadt et al., 2010) Intergenerational spaces are a great way to meet different kinds of people. Intergenerational spaces are programs that intentionally pair older and younger adults together through initiatives like mentorship, and story telling to foster mutual learning from different generations and reduce ageism. Pairing an older adult and a younger adult together provides companionship for older adults while it offers the younger generation mentorship, advice, and wisdom. (Reichstadt et al., 2010) Beyond individual benefits, these programs also foster stronger community ties and challenge the stereotypes that come with aging.

== Digital Platforms and Social Engagement ==
Technology has emerged to be an important tool that is widely used by people to sustain a meaningful social life and combat loneliness among older adults. The ability to partake in virtual events with the community, video call and stay in touch with others even when you're not physically with them is very important when it comes to keeping close relationships. Telehealth services and other health related services require having some sort of digital literacy, it has grown to be such an important aspect of our lives to the point being digitally illiterate can cost you your life. (Freund & Riediger, 2003) In addition to digital literacy, affordability and accessibility can also be factors that deepen the inequality of older adults and having meaningful relationships. Older adults without training or resources may be excluded from the benefits, which can reinforce isolation and health disparities (Sharma, 2020) Intergenerational training programs address this issue by pairing younger digital natives with older adults to provide hands-on support. Research shows that such initiatives improve digital confidence, reduce technophobia, and enhance older adults' ability to connect with family, peers, and services (Leedahl et al., 2019)

== Health Outcomes of Social Connection ==
Having meaningful social connections are tied to having better health outcomes later in life, research shows that older adults with strong, supportive networks have lower risks of dementia, cardiovascular disease, depression, and even a lower mortality rate. (Gow et al., 2007) Having these meaningful relationships can act like a protective layer to protect individuals from stress and depression and foster an environment where healthy behaviors are promoted. Many adults turn to unhealthy habits like drinking and smoking as a coping mechanism, having meaningful connections with people who care about you can provide you with the resources you need to cope with your stress in a healthier way. Other physiological benefits have also been documented through social connections. Strong social ties are associated with improved immune function, faster recovery after illness or surgery, and greater resilience against the physical declines associated with aging (Vaillant & Mukamal, 2001) Ultimately, these findings underscore that successful aging is not only about staying active but also about staying connected. Activity theory covers important aspects of successful aging like physical activities but "activity" should include meaningful engagement with others through family, friends and community support. By integrating intergenerational programs, community-based support, and digital tools we can help older adults get their life back and feel empowered to live not only longer but also healthier, more fulfilling lives with dignity, connection and purpose.

== Critics of Activity Theory ==
The critics of the activity theory state that it overlooks inequalities in health and economics that hinders the ability for older people to engage in such activities. Also, some older adults do not desire to engage in new challenges.
