= The Fable of the Dragon-Tyrant =

2005 short story by Nick Bostrom

- Short story by Nick Bostrom
- Genre: Fable

Publication
- Published in: Journal of Medical Ethics
- Media type: Print and online
- Publication date: May 2005

"The Fable of the Dragon-Tyrant" is a 2005 fable by Swedish philosopher Nick Bostrom about aging and death. It tells the story of a kingdom whose inhabitants are forced to sacrifice thousands of people each day to an apparently invincible dragon. Eventually, advances in technology allow them to kill the dragon, ending centuries of suffering and death. The dragon represents human senescence, and the fable argues for scientific research aimed at preventing age-related disease and extending healthy human life.

== Plot ==
The fable is set in a kingdom terrorized by a giant dragon that demands thousands of human lives each day. Attempts to kill the dragon fail because its scales are impervious to existing weapons. The kingdom eventually accepts the sacrifices as unavoidable, selecting elderly people to be delivered to the dragon. Over the centuries, an extensive bureaucracy develops to administer the sacrifices, including a railway transporting victims to the dragon's mountain. As the dragon grows, its demands increase to 100,000 people per day, and the cost of managing the sacrifices reaches one-seventh of the kingdom's economy.

Technological developments eventually lead some dragonologists to propose that the dragon could be killed using a projectile made from a material harder than its scales. Although initially dismissed, the proposal gains support after researchers demonstrate that the material can penetrate a dragon scale. The scientists petition the king for funding, but he repeatedly postpones consideration of their request while attending to other matters. The researchers subsequently appeal to the public, and support for killing the dragon grows.

The king convenes a public hearing to consider the proposal. The leading scientist explains that a weapon could be completed within twelve years if sufficient funding were provided. The king's chief advisor for morality opposes the project, arguing that mortality is an essential part of human existence and that eliminating the dragon would undermine human dignity. During the hearing, a young boy interrupts the proceedings to say that the dragon is bad because it killed his grandmother, who had promised to teach him how to bake gingerbread cookies. His testimony contributes to public support for the project, and the king commits the kingdom's resources to constructing the weapon.

After twelve years of research and development, the weapon is ready to be launched. Shortly before the launch, a young man approaches the king and begs him to stop the final train carrying victims to the dragon because his father is aboard. The king refuses, fearing that interrupting the sacrifices could alert the dragon and jeopardize the attack. The weapon is launched successfully, killing the dragon and ending its reign.

During the celebrations, the king expresses regret that the project was not undertaken earlier, recognizing that millions of lives could have been saved. The young man reveals that he was the boy who spoke at the public hearing twelve years earlier. The king apologizes for his father's death, while the young man thanks him for saving the lives of his remaining family. The story ends with the king acknowledging that the kingdom must now confront the challenges of a future without the dragon.

== Allegory and arguments ==
The dragon represents human senescence, and the kingdom's acceptance of its sacrifices represents the widespread treatment of aging and death as unavoidable features of human existence. Bostrom argues that resignation to aging was understandable when there were no means of preventing it, but that advances in science and technology create reasons to investigate whether its effects can be delayed or reversed. He acknowledges uncertainty about whether such interventions will become possible and the timescale on which they might be developed.

Bostrom maintains that there are moral reasons to prevent the suffering and death caused by aging, just as the kingdom has reasons to eliminate the dragon. He distinguishes this objective from extending life regardless of its quality, arguing instead for increasing the human healthspan, the period during which people remain healthy and free from age-related disability. He contends that research into slowing or halting senescence could allow people to remain healthy at ages they would otherwise not reach.

The fable also addresses the tendency to accept longstanding conditions as inevitable. Bostrom argues that repeated exposure to aging and death can make their consequences seem ordinary, while past failures to prevent them may encourage assumptions that future attempts will also fail. The dragonologists' eventual success illustrates his argument that technological developments can make previously unattainable objectives possible.

Another theme concerns the allocation of resources. In the story, the kingdom devotes one-seventh of its economy to administering the dragon's sacrifices rather than eliminating their cause. Bostrom compares this expenditure with the proportion of the United States' gross domestic product spent on healthcare at the time he wrote the fable. He argues that medical research and healthcare systems devote considerable resources to treating individual age-related diseases while comparatively little is spent on research intended to slow or prevent aging itself.

Bostrom also criticizes arguments that portray mortality as necessary for human dignity or a meaningful life. He states that the morality advisor's speech incorporates language drawn from contemporary bioethical arguments against life extension. In his interpretation, the advisor's appeal to human dignity obscures the suffering caused by the dragon, while the boy's account of his grandmother's death identifies the harm that the arguments overlook.

The conclusion of the fable concerns the consequences of delaying research. Bostrom argues that postponing the development of effective treatments for aging could result in preventable deaths. He acknowledges that substantially extended human lifespans would create new social challenges, including questions about population growth and the organization of society, but maintains that these problems would not justify accepting aging and death without attempting to prevent them.

== Publication history ==
"The Fable of the Dragon-Tyrant" was published in the May 2005 issue of the Journal of Medical Ethics. A shorter version appeared in Philosophy Now in 2012.

The fable has been translated into multiple languages, including Chinese, Czech, Dutch, Finnish, French, German, Hebrew, Italian, Polish, Russian, Serbian, Slovak, Slovenian, and Spanish.

== Adaptation ==
In April 2018, educational YouTuber CGP Grey released an animated adaptation of the fable. Writing for The Next Web, Tristan Greene described the video as an argument against the acceptance of aging and death. Nicola Bagalà of the Life Extension Advocacy Foundation praised the adaptation for its presentation of Bostrom's argument and its fidelity to the original story.
