= Older prisoners =

Prisoners 50 years or older

The term older prisoners is used by the U.S. Department of Justice and/or state departments for corrections when referring to individuals that are 50 years of age and older.

Older prisoners arguably age faster than their cohorts on the outside of the institution as a direct result of chronic, long-term diseases and a history more accustomed to drug and alcohol abuse. 8.6 percent of the total U.S. prison population is age 50 or older, and the average age for those considered to be older prisoners is 57.

With both incarceration rates and the nation's population higher than ever and stricter sentences being prescribed to perpetrators, the number of older prisoners is on the rise. The demographics, particularly race, of older prisoners resemble those of their younger peers, being that African Americans are disproportionately represented in making up nearly five and a half times of the prison population than their white counterparts make up.

The most commonly contracted diseases during incarceration share similar diagnoses to those outside of the institutions; however, the rate at which they afflict older prisoners is escalated significantly - 25% compared to their free cohorts not confined to prison environments. Psychiatric conditions are claimed to be detrimental to older prisoners where, specifically, rates of depression are higher and tend to have a lifelong lasting effect in a large percentage of older prisoners.

Some U.S. states have begun to expedite parole or expand compassionate release for older prisoners. In New York state, an Elder Parole bill was narrowly voted down in 2019; the bill would have required an immediate parole interview for people ages 55 and older who had served at least 15 years of their sentence. Supporters of the bill, including Release Aging People in Prison (an advocacy organization of formerly incarcerated individuals), have pledged to continue applying public pressure to legislators to release more older prisoners. Similarly, Maryland will take up legislation in the January 2020 legislative session to expand geriatric parole to about 265 inmates older than 60 who are suffering from illness or other complications of aging.
