= Anti-aging movement =

Social movement devoted to eliminating or reversing aging, or reducing its effects

The anti-aging movement is a social movement devoted to eliminating or reversing aging, or reducing the effects of it. A substantial portion of the attention of the movement is on the possibilities for life extension, but there is also interest in techniques such as cosmetic surgery which ameliorate the effects of aging rather than delay or defeat it.

There are numerous scientists of this movement with different approaches. Two of the most popular proponents of the anti-aging movement include Ray Kurzweil, who says humanity can defeat aging through the advance of technology, allowing us to reach the longevity escape velocity, and Aubrey de Grey, who says that the human body is a very complicated machine and, thus, can be repaired indefinitely. Other scientists and significant contributors to the movement include molecular biologists, geneticists, and biomedical gerontologists such as Gary Ruvkun, Cynthia Kenyon, and Arthur D. Levinson. However, figures in the gerontology community in 2003 tried to distance their research from the perceived pseudoscience of the movement.

== Anti-aging medicine ==
Anti-aging medicine has become a budding and rapidly growing medical specialty as physicians who initially sought treatment for themselves have received training and certification in its practice by organizations such as the American Academy of Anti-Aging Medicine (A4M) co-founded by Dr Robert M. Goldman and Ronald Klatz.

=== Human growth hormone ===
Central to anti-aging medicine is administration of human growth hormone. Clinical studies have shown that low-dose growth hormone (GH) treatment for adults with GH deficiency changes the body composition by increasing muscle mass, decreasing fat mass, and increasing bone density and muscle strength. It also improves cardiovascular parameters (i.e. decrease of LDL cholesterol) and affects the quality of life without significant side effects. However, it is also said to have potentially dangerous side effects when used in injectable form if proper protocols are not followed. It is not approved for use in healthy aging patients, though the restriction is occasionally sidestepped by means of a diagnosis of some injury, organic condition, or adult-growth-hormone deficiency which may have resulted in reduced secretion of the hormone.

=== Menopausal hormone drugs ===
Administration of estrogen and other hormones such as progestin were popularized by the 1966 book Feminine Forever by Robert A. Wilson. However, the increase of the use of estrogen was shown to be associated with an increased risk of cancer. Later, in 2002, research into the long-term effects of estrogen on post-menopausal women, the Women's Health Initiative, produced evidence that there were serious side effects. Physicians who prescribe the hormones now prescribe low doses of the drugs. Research into the long-term effects of hormone replacement therapy is continuing, with a 2025 Cochrane systematic review concluding that long-term use may decrease the risk of bone fractures or postmenopausal osteoporosis, but increase the risk of stroke, heart attacks, endometrial cancer, and breast cancer. Hormone therapy is generally only recommended for postmenopausal women who are at a high risk of osteoporosis when non-hormonal treatments are not suitable. Hormone therapy is not suitable or advised for treating cardiovascular disease, dementia, or for preventing cognitive decline in postmenopausal women. The risks of long-term hormonal therapy for women under 50 years of age have not been determined.

=== Senolytics ===
A senolytic (from the words senescence and -lytic, "decomposition or breakdown") is among a class of small molecules under basic research to determine if they can selectively induce death of senescent cells and improve health in humans. A goal of this research is to discover or develop agents to delay, prevent, alleviate, or reverse age-related diseases. Removal of senescent cells with senolytics has been proposed as a method of enhancing immunity during aging.

A related concept is "senostatic", which means to suppress senescence.

== Scientific approaches ==
Biogerontology is a scientific discipline which has the same area of interest but, as a branch of gerontology, takes a more conservative approach. Caloric restriction is a phenomenon introduced in anti-aging techniques which focuses on depletion of calories and taking the right amount of nutrients necessary for growth.

=== Calorie restriction ===
Calorie restriction (CR) refers to a dietary restriction that focuses on less calorie intake to increase longevity and reduce age-related disease in humans. Calorie restriction maintains a low calorie intake that helps to regulate the rate of aging and increases the youthfulness of an individual or animal. Low calorie intake has directly been correlated to negative energy balance which promotes low body mass index (BMI) and comparatively high plasma dehydroepiandrosterone (DHEA) for improved life expectancy. Calorie restriction has widely been practiced by pregnant women and people with pre-existing medical conditions such as diabetes. The right amount of calorie restriction help pregnant women to achieve positive weight gain whereas a significant drop in calorie intake can lead to hypothalamic alterations leading to long-term effects in the offspring. Moderate CR in diabetic patients increases insulin sensitivity and reduces the amount of hepatic fat in obese individual and type 2 diabetes. Long term CR in older animals results in stem cell function similar to that of the younger groups. The active stem cell function helps in enhanced recovery of the damaged skeletal muscle tissue, which is slower in older individuals compared to younger individuals. CR in the United States has shown a prolonged life span in women compared to men as women tend to consume 25% fewer calories than men in their lifetime. The statistical analysis of CR available for anti-aging movement in humans is insufficient to prove the prolonged lifespan associated with CR.

== Mass movement ==
A substantial fraction of older people, taking their cue from alternative medicine, purchase and use herbal supplements and other products which promise relief from the incidents and dangers of aging. However, many such products are unregulated, and can instead pose serious health risks.

== Reception ==
There are at least two opposite views on the prospects of anti-aging research and development. One view is that there is a great deal of over-heated rhetoric in use with respect to life extension with over-optimistic projections by its advocates. They also claim that there is little evidence that any significant breakthrough has been made, or is on the horizon. Some state that this is largely due to a current lack of funding or interest in the issue. A study of the commonly used supplements and hormone treatments published in 2006 in the Cleveland Clinic Journal of Medicine showed that none of them are effective for extending life. Another view is noticing that recent scientific successes in rejuvenation and extending the lifespan of model animals and discovery of a variety of species (including humans of advanced ages) having negligible senescence give hope to achieve negligible senescence (cancel aging) for younger humans, reverse ageing, or at least significantly delay it.

Though some scientists think curing aging is impossible, there are some criticisms of both the time frame life extensionists envision (the first, perhaps somewhat crude, treatments within the next several decades, or at least before the beginning of the 22nd century) and of whether curing aging is even desirable. Common criticisms of the idea of life extension are fears it will cause the world to be more overpopulated; however, de Grey counters that by saying that since menopause would also be delayed, women could wait longer to have children and, thus, the rate of growth would actually decline as a result. Also, the slowly growing population would buy centuries of time to figure out new places to live, such as space colonies.

== See also ==
- Death
- Aging
- Brian Hanley (biohacker)
- Senescence
- Negligible senescence
- Biological immortality
- Immortality
- Indefinite lifespan
- Longevity
- Transhumanism
- Extropianism
- Rejuvenation
- Biogerontology
- List of life extension topics
- Index of life extension-related articles
