= NASM =

NASM may refer to:

- National Academy of Sports Medicine, an American organisation
- Netwide Assembler, a free x86 assembler
- National Air and Space Museum, a Smithsonian museum in Washington, D.C., and Virginia, US
- National Association of Schools of Music, US
- Holland America Line, formerly the Nederlandsch-Amerikaansche Stoomvaart-Maatschappij (Netherlands-American Steamship Company)
- Naval Anti-Ship Missile (disambiguation), one of two types of missiles, short- and medium-range, respectively
