= American Academy of Anti-Aging Medicine =

American nonprofit organization

The American Academy of Anti-Aging Medicine (A4M) is a United States 501(c)(3) nonprofit organization, that promotes the field of anti-aging medicine, and the organization trains and certifies physicians in this specialty. As of 2011, approximately 26,000 practitioners had been given A4M certificates. The field of anti-aging medicine is not recognized by established medical organizations, such as the American Board of Medical Specialties (ABMS) and the American Medical Association (AMA). The academy's activities include lobbying and public relations. The A4M was founded in 1993 by osteopathic physicians Robert M. Goldman and Ronald Klatz, and as of 2013 claimed 26,000 members from 120 countries.

Several of the anti-aging methods recommended by the academy have wide support among experts in the field, such as exercise and a healthy diet, but others, such as hormone treatments, do not have support from a consensus of the wider medical community. Many scientists studying aging, dissociate themselves from the claims of A4M, and critics have accused the group of using misleading marketing to sell expensive and ineffective products. The A4M's founders and merchants who promote products through the organization have been involved in legal and professional disputes.

The activities of the A4M are controversial: in 2003 a commentary on the response of the scientific community to the promotion of anti-aging medicine noted that the activities of the A4M were seen as a threat to the credibility of serious scientific research on aging. According to MSNBC, anti-aging advocates have responded to such criticism by describing it as censorship perpetrated by a conspiracy of the US government, notably the Food and Drug Administration, the AMA, and the mainstream media, motivated by competing commercial interests. Tom Perls of the Boston University School of Medicine, a prominent critic of the organization, has stated that claims of censorship and suppression are a common theme in what he calls "anti-aging quackery".

== Beliefs ==
According to The New York Times, their co-founder and president Ronald Klatz stated that "We're not about growing old gracefully. We're about never growing old."

Writing in the 2001 issue of the journal Generations, historian Carole Haber of the University of Delaware, states that Klatz' aspirations and the rhetoric of the A4M "reflect well-worn ideas and the often-enunciated hopes of the past", drawing parallels with the ideas of the 19th century physiologists Charles-Édouard Brown-Séquard, Serge Voronoff and Eugen Steinach. Haber states that the current resurgence of these ideas may be due to their appeal to the aging Baby Boom Generation, in a culture that is focused on the ideal of youth. Haber has also discussed the strong continuities within the philosophy of the anti-aging movement, writing that "For Steinach and Voronoff, as for the members of the A4M, old age was a 'grotesque' disease that could be scientifically eradicated through the correct combination of hormones, diet, and surgery."

A 2006 review of anti-aging medicine notes that of the researchers who are interested in this topic, the "vast majority dissociate themselves from the A4M." The Los Angeles Times states that "Many physicians, researchers and scientists, delving into the physiological aspects of human aging, view the Academy's activities with disdain, saying that the organization is an inappropriate blend of scientific and commercial interests."

== Activities ==
The main activity of the A4M is PR and advocacy for its brand of anti-aging medicine. It does this through publications, on-line activity and sponsoring conferences including the World Anti-Aging Congress and Exposition and the Annual World Congress on Anti-Aging Medicine. Some of these conferences are in conjunction with the World Anti-Aging Academy of Medicine, an umbrella group for several national anti-aging organizations that is also headed by Goldman. The Los Angeles Times stated that the 2004 annual conference of the A4M at Las Vegas presented a mix of "scientific and technical presentations" and exhibitors selling "wrinkle creams, hair-growing potions, sexual enhancement pills and hormone treatments".

According to a review of the anti-aging movement published in 2005, the A4M is one of the most prominent organizations that are making "attempts at legitimizing anti-aging as a medical specialty". The review notes that these efforts at legitimization are contentious and have been rebuffed by some academic scientists who work on aging, who instead attempt to portray the A4M as "charlatans whose main goal is making money." In a review of the history of anti-aging medicine published in 2004, Robert Binstock of Case Western Reserve University noted that A4M "actively solicits and displays numerous advertisements on its website for products and services (such as cosmetics and alternative medicines and therapies), anti-aging clinics, and anti-aging physicians and practitioners." The Times reported in 2004 that Klatz professes outrage at suggestions that he is motivated by money, quoting him as insisting that "The only thing that I sell are books... my website is non-commercial – we're just trying to advance science." The Times went on to note a partnership between Klatz and Goldman and a business named Market America, which sells products that promise to "slow the ageing process". The A4M's American Board of Anti-Aging Medicine (ABAAM) states that it offers anti-aging medicine as a specialty and gives educational credits to those who attend A4M conferences. The New York Times has reported that the American Board of Medical Specialties does not recognize this body as having professional standing. MSNBC noted that "as far as the American Medical Association or the American Board of Medical Specialties is concerned, there is no such thing as an anti-aging specialty." Robert Binstock stated in a 2004 review article in The Gerontologist that "Although the organization is not recognized by the American Medical Association, A4M has established three board-certification programs under its auspices—for physicians, chiropractors, dentists, naturopaths, podiatrists, pharmacists, registered nurses, nurse practitioners, nutritionists, dieticians, sports trainers and fitness consultants, and PhDs."

== Publications ==
The A4M publishes Anti Aging Medical News, a trade periodical which is their official magazine, as well as proceedings of its anti-aging conferences in a periodical called Anti-Aging Therapeutics, this is edited by Klatz and Goldman.

The International Journal of Anti-Aging Medicine (IJAAM) was another periodical published by the A4M. According to Ulrich's Periodicals Directory, IJAAM was published by Total Health Holdings, LLC from 1998 to 2001, on behalf of the A4M.

The contents of the International Journal of Anti-Aging Medicine have been strongly criticised. In a 2002 letter published in Science, Aubrey de Grey described them as consisting of a set of advertisements for a "pseudoscientific anti-aging industry". According to Bruce Carnes of the University of Oklahoma:

This alleged "journal" is particularly misleading because it gives the false impression that it is a genuine scientific journal and that what is published in it is peer-reviewed. It is little more than an advertising vehicle for every conceivable anti-aging product.

Leonard Hayflick of the University of California, San Francisco, a former editor of Experimental Gerontology, writes:

The International Journal of Anti-Aging Medicine is not a recognized scientific journal. What I find reprehensible about this 'journal' is that advertisers who publish in it can then claim there is scientific evidence to support their outrageous assertions by pointing to the publication in an alleged scientific journal.

In 2009 the A4M stated that it is no longer associated with the journal and that it had sold its interests in this publication in 1999. They also defended the scientific quality of its contents, writing that almost all of its articles were reviewed by an editorial board before publication. Robert Binstock of Case Western Reserve University stated in 2004 that this periodical is a "nonrefereed publication".

== Divergent views on anti-aging products ==
According to a 2002 article in the Seattle Times, there are two opposing viewpoints of anti-aging products. The article states that the first view is represented by scientists who publish their findings in the scientific literature and who believe that no currently available intervention can slow or prevent aging. The alternative viewpoint is represented by people who the article states have "fewer credentials" and who promote a range of products that claim to have anti-aging properties. A similar observation was made by Business Week in 2006, when they stated that although anti-aging medicine is increasingly popular, there is "precious little scientific data to back up their claims that the potions extend life."

As an example of the first viewpoint, a 2004 review in Trends in Biotechnology written by Leigh Turner of the Institute for Advanced Study in Princeton, New Jersey stated that the products promoted by the A4M have "no credible scientific basis" and that "there are no proven, scientifically established 'anti-aging' medications". A 2006 review published in the Cleveland Clinic Journal of Medicine of the antioxidants and hormones that are promoted as anti-aging products by A4M and clinics like the Palm Springs Life Extension Institute concluded that these products have "minimal to no effect on improving longevity or functional abilities." In an editorial accompanying this study, Thomas Perls stated that although many unjustified claims were made about anti-ageing products, no substance had yet been shown to halt or slow the aging process. Similarly, the National Institute on Aging, who are part of the National Institutes of Health, published a general warning in 2009 against businesses that claim anti-aging benefits for their products, describing these as "health scams" and stating that "no treatments have been proven to slow or reverse the aging process".

The Seattle Times quotes Klatz as describing those who doubt the validity of anti-aging medicine as "flat-earthers" who make unjustified criticisms that are not backed by scientific evidence, the article also states that Klatz "sees the science and medical establishments as out to get him."

=== Human growth hormone controversy ===
The American Academy of Anti-Aging Medicine was formed following a 1990 study on human growth hormone (hGH) that was published in the New England Journal of Medicine. The study was performed by Daniel Rudman and colleagues at the Medical College of Wisconsin. Rudman had treated twelve men over 60 years of age with human growth hormone; after six months, these men had an increase in lean body mass and a decrease in adipose tissue mass when compared with a group of nine men who did not receive hormone. Members of the anti-aging movement have interpreted these results to support a role for growth hormone in slowing or reversing aging. A review in The Journal of Urology noted that this promotion of growth hormone as an anti-aging remedy is "arguably similar" to ideas that date back to the late 19th century, when the physiologist Charles-Édouard Brown-Séquard advocated rejuvenating hormone products prepared from animal testicles and stated that "the injections have taken 30 years off my life".

The New York Times reports that the idea that growth hormone can improve "health, energy level and sense of well-being." is a core belief of the A4M, with Klatz writing a book in 1998 entitled Grow Young with HGH: The Amazing Medically Proven Plan to Reverse Aging where he states "The 'Fountain of Youth' lies within the cells of each of us. All you need to do is release it". A 2005 review in the Journal of Endocrinological Investigation noted the long history of these ideas, but stated that the "concept of a 'hormonal fountain of youth' is predominantly mythological." Nevertheless, Klatz maintains that growth hormone reverses aging as a physical process and has described growth hormone as "the first medically proven age-reversal therapy." However, MSNBC reports that Daniel Rudman, the author of the 1990 study that sparked the movement, "issued many caveats and cautions about using HGH and never recommended its use to delay aging. In fact, he was horrified his study was being used to support the industry especially since heavy use of growth hormone can have unwanted side effects".

The New York Times states that medical authorities not affiliated with the A4M question the safety and efficacy of the use of growth hormone in anti-aging medicine, quoting Michael Fossell of Michigan State University who stated that "hormone therapies are the new patent medicines – cure-alls embraced by a too-trusting public." A 2003 review that was published in the Annual Review of Medicine noted that the long-term risks or benefits of this treatment are uncertain, that "neither the benefits nor the dangers have been defined" and advising that a "prudent physician should not condone the use of GH for normal aging".

As a result of the reactions to the 1990 article and its frequent citation by proponents of HGH as an anti-aging agent, in 2003 the New England Journal of Medicine published two articles that strongly and clearly stated that there was insufficient medical and scientific evidence to support use of HGH as anti-aging drug. One article was written by the Journal's then-editor in chief, Jeffrey M. Drazen, M.D. and was entitled, "Inappropriate Advertising of Dietary Supplements". It focused mostly on the advertising of dietary supplements. The other article was written by the editor-in-chief at the time the 1990 article was published, Mary Lee Vance, M.D., and was entitled, "Can Growth Hormone Prevent Aging?"; it focused more on the medical issues around whether there was sufficient evidence to use HGH as an anti-aging agent.

A 2007 review on the use of human growth hormone as an anti-aging treatment in healthy elderly people published in the Annals of Internal Medicine concluded the risks of HGH significantly outweigh the benefits, noted soft tissue edema as a common side effect and found no evidence that the hormone prolongs life. ABC News interviewed Hau Liu of Stanford University and lead author of the paper, who stated that people are paying thousands of dollars a year for a treatment that has not been proved to be beneficial and has many side effects. ABC News also reported that the A4M disputed the conclusions of this review, quoting from an A4M statement which maintained that growth hormone supplementation is beneficial in healthy adults and which described arguments against the use of the hormone as a "heinous act of malpractice".

Some small studies have shown that low-dose GH treatment for adults with severe GH deficiency, such as that produced after surgical removal of the pituitary gland, produces positive changes in body composition by increasing muscle mass, decreasing fat mass, increasing bone density and muscle strength; improves cardiovascular parameters (i.e. decrease of LDL cholesterol), and improves quality of life without significant side effects. The extension of this approach to healthy elderly people is an area of current research, with a 2000 review in Hormone Research commenting that "Clearly more studies are needed before GH replacement for the elderly becomes established." and noting that "safety issues will require close scrutiny".

A 2008 review of the controversy surrounding the use of growth hormone in anti-aging medicine which published in Clinical Interventions in Aging noted the opinions of the A4M on this topic, but suggested that high levels of growth hormone might actually accelerate aging. This concern was repeated by the United States National Institute on Aging who stated in 2009 that:

As with other hormones, hGH levels often decline with age, but this decrease is not necessarily bad. At least one epidemiological study suggests that people who have high levels of hGH are more apt to die at younger ages than those with lower levels of the hormone. Researchers have also studied animals with genetic disorders that suppress growth hormone production and secretion and found reduced growth hormone secretion may actually promote longevity in those species that have been tested.

The Clinical Interventions in Aging review also stated that although the decreasing levels of the hormone seen in the elderly might reduce quality of life, this change could protect from age-related diseases and cited evidence linking GH to cancer. This concern was mirrored in a 2008 review published in Clinical Endocrinology, which stated that the risk of increasing the incidence of cancer was a strong argument against the use of this hormone as an "elixir of youth" in healthy adults.

== Legal disputes ==
=== Credential dispute ===
The academy's co-founders include Klatz and Goldman, who are licensed osteopathic physicians and have Doctor of Osteopathic Medicine degrees (D.O.). However, according to The New York Times, they also received M.D. degrees as doctors of medicine from a university in Belize in 1988, although the paper notes that they had not studied in Belize. In 2009 Klatz and Goldman stated that these degrees involved eight years of medical and surgical training and a year of clinical rotations. The New York Times reported that the Illinois State Board of Medical Registration did not recognize these M.D. degrees, and stated that the Board fined the men for using M.D. after their names. Writing in 2004, The Times stated that Klatz and Goldman "agreed to pay $5,000 penalties for allegedly identifying themselves as doctors of medicine in the state without being "properly licensed"." The Illinois Division of Professional Regulation disciplinary records state that Klatz and Goldman "agreed to cease and desist using the designation "M.D." in addition to the appropriate "D.O." title and fined $5,000. Both physicians did receive degrees as doctors of medicine, but were never properly licensed to use the title "M.D." in Illinois". In 2009, Klatz and Goldman stated that Illinois Department of Financial & Professional Regulation had determined that they are currently:

licensed physicians and surgeons of osteopathic medicine in good standing in Illinois for over 20 years, which allows them to practice and carry out all duties equivalent to what a medical doctor, an M.D., may do in Illinois.

They go on to state that they have "valid M.D. degrees from a recognized medical school". Writing in 2004, the historian Carole Haber put this dispute into context, noting that "like the gland doctors before them, the leaders of the A4M have had their practices and credentials assailed by the medical and legal communities".

=== Regulatory and tort issues ===
Two articles in the Journal of the American Medical Association have stated that the use of growth hormone as an anti-aging product is illegal. However, Klatz and Goldman dispute this, arguing that this use of growth hormone is legal. The United States Department of Justice states that growth hormone is a potentially dangerous drug and its supply "for any use ... other than the treatment of a disease or other recognized medical condition, where such use has been authorized by the Secretary of Human Services" is a felony under the Anabolic Steroids Control Act of 1990. Similarly, the FDA has stated in a Warning Letter that no growth hormone products have been approved as anti-aging treatments and supply for this use is therefore illegal and an "offense punishable by not more than 5 years in prison". In 2007 The New York Times discussed ongoing federal and state investigations into illegal trafficking of human growth hormone and anabolic steroids, noting that "many of the individuals and companies cited in the indictments have been involved with the academy and its conventions over the years". However, the paper notes that the academy is not accused of any wrongdoing as part of these investigations and quotes Klatz and Goldman as stating that "they barely knew the suspects or the nature of their businesses". A May 2000 article in the Los Angeles Times suggested that, from an examination of the disciplinary records of doctors in California, members of the A4M in this state were approximately ten times more likely to be disciplined than the national average. In the article, Klatz is quoted as commenting that:

When you are out on the frontier, you are going to attract some of the very best people, and some who are ... not the very best. We have had situations where we've had to contact people and say, 'Would you mind affiliating yourself with another organization?' It is an ongoing process, and I think we are attracting better and better doctors.

=== Wikipedia ===
According to lawyers claiming to act for A4M and one or more people involved with it, their clients had initiated "defamation actions in New York and Massachusetts" against Wikipedia editors in 2009. According to Courthouse News Service, the A4M co-founders Ronald Klatz and Robert Goldman are pursuing legal action against the online encyclopedia Wikipedia in New York County Court, seeking damages for alleged defamation.

=== Dispute with Olshansky and Perls ===
In 2002, A4M was a co-recipient of the first "Silver Fleece Award", created to publicize "the most ridiculous claims about antiaging medicine" according to the award's inventor, S. Jay Olshansky. Heated legal and academic controversies ensued. Olshansky, a biodemographer at the University of Illinois at Chicago, described it as "a lighthearted attempt to make the public aware of ... anti-aging quackery". This "award" was presented by Olshansky, who stated that in his opinion, a "suite of anti-aging substances created by Ronald Klatz and Robert Goldman ... and sold on the Internet by Market America, Inc." had made "outrageous or exaggerated claims about slowing or reversing human aging". Writing in Biogerontology, anthropologist Courtney Mykytyn of the University of Southern California states that this award appears to have been an attempt by Olshansky to protect what he saw as "'real' science from the taint of swindle." Mykytyn states that this involved Olshansky "tagging the A4M as fraudulent and its principals as profiteers". In response, the academy filed defamation lawsuits, demanding $150 million in damages, with Klatz stating "We take great exception to Mr Olshansky and his tactics which have finally compelled us to file suit for various unprofessional and improper actions". Klatz and Goldman described this action as "part of a larger campaign of disparagement by Olshansky and Perls aimed at discrediting A4M and its founders". The Chicago Tribune quoted experts on libel law who stated that the action was an "almost unheard-of attempt to punish academics for comments made in their professional capacity". CNN states that Olshansky countersued and that "both sides eventually agreed to drop their cases". The Chicago Tribune states that the case "ended in a settlement, with neither side paying damages or the other's costs."

In 2002, Olshansky, Hayflick, and Carnes published a position paper, endorsed by 51 scientists in the field of aging, stating that "no currently marketed intervention has yet been proved to slow, stop or reverse human aging...The entrepreneurs, physicians and other health care practitioners who make these claims are taking advantage of consumers who cannot easily distinguish between the hype and reality of interventions designed to influence the aging process and age-related diseases".

In 2009, Imre Zs-Nagy of the University of Debrecen, Hungary, defended A4M from what he called the "gerontological establishment" in an editorial published in Archives of Gerontology and Geriatrics, a journal Zs-Nagy founded and of which he is editor-in-chief. Zs-Nagy defended therapies promoted by A4M, which he states are related to his own "membrane hypothesis of aging", as theoretically feasible. He described the conflict between the scientific community and the academy as one pitting government funds, "personal gain" and "intellectual dishonesty" against the "independent, open-minded approach" of A4M, calling the conflict one of the "biggest scandals of the recent history of medicine".

== See also ==
- Maximum life span
- ApothéCure Inc.
- Strategic lawsuit against public participation (SLAPP Suits)
- List of organizations opposing mainstream science
