= Robert A. Wilson (gynecologist) =

American Gynecologist

- Born: 1895
- Died: 1981
- Education: SUNY Downstate Medical Center
- Occupations: Gynecologist; Medical researcher
- Known for: Feminine Forever; Wilson Research Foundation
- Spouse: Thelma A. Wilson
- Medical career
- Institutions: Methodist Hospital of Brooklyn
- Notable works: Feminine Forever

Robert A. Wilson was an American gynecologist who is known for writing the best-selling 1966 book Feminine Forever. He is also known for his organization the Wilson Research Foundation (WRA). In Feminine Forever, Wilson promoted the use of estrogen therapy to avoid the menopause and associated symptoms. He characterized menopause as a serious disease state and made strong claims about the effectiveness and safety of menopausal hormone therapy in alleviating it and improving quality of life and health. Wilson's claims were criticized as not being based on adequate research and evidence. Subsequently, trials such as the Women's Health Initiative (WHI) contradicted Wilson's claims and showed that menopausal hormone therapy could have significant medical risks and that its benefits were not as great as once believed.

Wilson's early medical career was unremarkable, and he did not publish his first papers until 1962, when he was in his late 60s.

It was revealed by Wilson's son, Ronald Wilson, that Wyeth-Ayerst had secretly paid all of the fees for Wilson to write his book and also helped finance his foundation. Other pharmaceutical companies additionally funded the Wilson Research Foundation. Within 10 years of the publishing of his book, in which Wilson promoted the use of conjugated estrogens (Premarin) and of menopausal hormone therapy in general, Premarin became the fifth most-prescribed drug in the United States.

== Works ==
=== Books ===
- Robert A. Wilson (1966). Feminine Forever. M. Evans and Company. ISBN 978-0-87131-049-1. OCLC 10373653. OL 5982073M.

=== Journal articles ===
- Wilson RA (October 1962). "The roles of estrogen and progesterone in breast and genital cancer". JAMA. 182: 327–31. doi:10.1001/jama.1962.03050430001001. PMID 14001079.
- Wilson RA, Wilson TA (April 1963). "The fate of the nontreated postmenopausal woman: a plea for the maintenance of adequate estrogen from puberty to the grave". J Am Geriatr Soc. 11: 347–62. doi:10.1111/j.1532-5415.1963.tb00068.x. PMID 14001078.
- Wilson RA (December 1963). "The obsolete menopause". Conn Med. 27: 735–6. PMID 14090607.
- Wilson RA, Brevetti RE, Wilson TA (1963). "Specific procedures for the elimination of the menopause". West J Surg Obstet Gynecol. 71 (1): 110–121. PMID 12259259.
- Wilson RA (January 1964). "The obsolete menopause". Del Med J. 36: 20–1. PMID 14113026.
- Wilson RA (August 1964). "The estrogen cancer myth". Clin Med (Northfield). 71: 1343–52. PMID 15446202.
- Wilson RA, Marino ER, Wilson TA (October 1966). "Norethynodrel-mestranol (enovid) for prevention and treatment of the climacteric". J Am Geriatr Soc. 14 (10): 967–85. doi:10.1111/j.1532-5415.1966.tb02880.x. PMID 5924635.
- Wilson RA, Wilson TA (November 1972). "The basic philosophy of estrogen maintenance". J Am Geriatr Soc. 20 (11): 521–3. doi:10.1111/j.1532-5415.1972.tb00753.x. PMID 5082121.

== See also ==
- Anti-aging movement § Menopausal hormone drugs
