= Mart-Life Detox Clinic =

Medical spa in Nigeria

The Mart-Life Detox Clinic is Nigeria's first Modern Myar Medical spa. The clinic is an Anti-aging Spa and Wellness center and also the first of its kind in Africa. Medical Art Center (MART) established for assisted reproduction, opened the Modern Mayr Medical Spa in Maryland, Lagos in collaboration with the Viva-Mayr Clinic in Austria. The spa is a wellness and detoxification centre with a therapy and beauty clinic.
