= AFAA =

AFAA may refer to:

- Adult Film Association of America
- Athletics and Fitness Association of America
- Association for Families who have Adopted from Abroad (UK Registered Charity)
- Americans for African Adoptions
- Avatar: Fire and Ash, a 2025 science fiction film, and third installment of the Avatar film franchise
