= Brian Hanley (microbiologist) =

American microbiologist

- Born: c. 1957 (age c. 68)
- Education: University of California, Davis (PhD)
- Occupations: microbiologist, CEO of Butterfly Sciences

Brian P. Hanley (born c. 1957) is an American microbiologist and founder of Butterfly Sciences. He is known for self-experimenting with gene therapy to try to improve health span.

== Biography ==
Early in his research career, Hanley's areas of study were biodefense and terrorism. He contributed chapters to two books about these subjects. Hanley obtained a PhD in Microbiology from University of California, Davis in 2009. The same year, he founded Butterfly Sciences in Davis, California to develop a gene therapy to treat HIV AIDS using a combination of GHRH and an intracellular vaccine.

After founding Butterfly Sciences, Hanley continued publishing scholarly literature in multiple fields that examined economic topics such as banking, cryptocurrency, and climate.

During the COVID-19 pandemic, with Steve Keen and George Church, Hanley also contributed to literature about public health strategy in response to the pandemic.

== Self-experimentation ==
Hanley could not raise money for his company Butterfly Sciences and decided to obtain proof of concept by testing gene therapy on himself. Hanley said: "I wanted to prove it, I wanted to do it for myself, and I wanted to make progress." He designed the plasmid containing a gene coding for growth hormone–releasing hormone and had it made by a scientific supply company for around $10,000. However, the total cost of development was over $500,000.

He said that he corresponded with the FDA prior to starting his self-experimentation, and that the FDA told him he needed to file and get approval for an Investigational New Drug (IND) application, but Hanley did not agree that he needed FDA approval and proceeded without it. Hanley later co-authored a 2019 paper on Self-Experimentation, ethics and law with George Church, which bears out his position regarding the necessity for an IND. He did not perform any animal tests before testing the plasmid on himself, but won institutional review board (IRB) approval regardless on his proposed clinical research plans.

A physician assisted in administration of the plasmid to Hanley's thigh using electroporation. The plasmids were administered twice: once in summer 2015 and a second larger dose in July 2016.

Hanley claims the treatment has helped him. He reported that his white blood cell count and testosterone increased and his LDL levels dropped.

A researcher at George Church's Harvard University laboratory observed the experiment and Hanley's blood was then studied. The scientific results were published in December 2021, coauthored with George Church.

== Transgender research ==
Hanley published an article in 2011 providing a biological explanation for transgender identity and homosexuality.

== Selected publications ==
- Keen, Steve; Lenton, Timothy M.; Garrett, Timothy J.; Rae, James W. B.; Hanley, Brian P.; Grasselli, Matheus (2022). "Estimates of economic and environmental damages from tipping points cannot be reconciled with the scientific literature". Proceedings of the National Academy of Sciences. 119 (21) e2117308119. Bibcode:2022PNAS..11917308K. doi:10.1073/pnas.2117308119. PMC 9173761. PMID 35588449.
- Hanley, Brian P. (2021). "Is Modern Monetary Theory's prescription to spend without reference to tax receipts an invitation to tyranny?". Acta Oeconomica. 71 (3): 431–450. doi:10.1556/032.2021.00021. S2CID 244228624.
- Hanley, Brian P.; Keen, Steve; Church, George (2020). "A Call for a Three-Tiered Pandemic Public Health Strategy in Context of SARS-CoV-2". Rejuvenation Research. 23 (4): 281–283. doi:10.1089/rej.2020.2363. PMC 7462018. PMID 32539623.
- Hanley, Brian P.; Bains, William; Church, George (2019). "Review of Scientific Self-Experimentation: Ethics History, Regulation, Scenarios, and Views Among Ethics Committees and Prominent Scientists". Rejuvenation Research. 22 (1): 31–42. doi:10.1089/rej.2018.2059. PMID 29926769. S2CID 49345158.
- Brian P Hanley (2014) Radiation – Exposure and its treatment: A modern handbook ASIN B00D7KLQYY
- Hanley, Brian P. (2011-12-15). "Dual-gender macro-chimeric tissue discordance is predicted to be a significant cause of human homosexuality and transgenderism". Hypotheses in the Life Sciences. 1 (3): 63–70.
- Hanley, Brian P.; Borup, Birthe (2010). "Aerosol influenza transmission risk contours: A study of humid tropics versus winter temperate zone". Virology Journal. 7 98. doi:10.1186/1743-422X-7-98. PMC 2893155. PMID 20470403.

== See also ==
- Anti-aging movement
- Biopunk
- Posthumanism
- Self-experimentation
- Transhumanism
