= Micheal Clark =

Michel Clark

Micheal A. Clark is an American physical therapist. He is the president and CEO of the National Academy of Sports Medicine (NASM).

He was the team physical therapist to the NBA's Phoenix Suns. He is an adjunct faculty member for the master’s of science in injury prevention and performance enhancement at the California University of Pennsylvania in California, Pennsylvania.

== Career ==
Clark has worked for professional and amateur athletes. Clark was a physical therapist for the St. Lucia national team at the 2000 Summer Olympics and Team USA Boxing at the 1996 Summer Olympics. He has written multiple books on physical therapy and its practices.
