= Jacques Rossouw =

South African doctor

Jacques Rossouw is a South African-born physician and epidemiologist. He retired as head of the Women's Health Initiative, and is based in Washington, D.C.

In 2006, he appeared in the Time 100 listing.

He is a graduate of the University of Cape Town.
