= National Academy of Sports Medicine =

American fitness training provider

National Academy of Sports Medicine (NASM)
- Founded: 1987; 39 years ago
- Founder: Robert M. Goldman
- Type: For-profit
- Purpose: Certifications, continuing education, professional enablement
- Headquarters: Gilbert, AZ
- Region served: Members in 100+ countries
- Method: Certifications, technical assistance, trainings and seminars
- CEO: Mehul Patel
- Parent organization: Ascend Learning
- Website: nasm.org

The National Academy of Sports Medicine (NASM) is an American organization that provides certification, education, and career development opportunities for professionals in the fitness, wellness, and sports industries. Established in 1987, NASM has gained recognition for its evidence-based approach to fitness and wellness education and has developed a range of programs aimed at enhancing the skills of personal trainers, wellness coaches, athletic trainers, strength and conditioning coaches, physical therapists, and other health professionals. Its headquarters is located in Gilbert, Arizona. NASM is a subsidiary of Ascend Learning.

From 2023 to 2026, Newsweek and Statista named NASM to the "America's Top Online Learning Providers" list. The ranking is based on a survey of user satisfaction and institutional reputation.

== History ==
NASM was founded in 1987 by Robert M. Goldman with the goal of creating standardized educational programs for the personal fitness training industry. In 1998, Neal Spruce relocated NASM to California and integrated it with Apex Fitness. Subsequently, in 2000, Dr. Micheal Clark became the CEO of NASM, introducing the Optimum Performance Training™ (OPT™) model. This model, which emphasizes a systematic approach to training with phases of stabilization, strength, and power, aims to reduce injury risk and has become integral to NASM's educational programs.

The NASM curriculum is based on the Optimum Performance Training (OPT) model, a periodization system divided into three levels: Stabilization, Strength, and Power. These levels are further categorized into five specific phases: Stabilization Endurance, Strength Endurance, Muscular Development, Maximal Strength, and Power.

Independent research has evaluated the efficacy of this model. A 2025 randomized controlled trial (RCT) published in the found that a 26-week NASM-OPT program led to improvements in maximal lower-limb strength and explosive power in adolescent athletes compared to traditional periodization models. A separate 2025 clinical study (NCT06977919) utilized the OPT model to investigate improvements in postural control and pectoral strength over a 12-week intervention.

Over the years, NASM has expanded its certification offerings and has certified over 1.4 million individuals globally. In 2015, NASM acquired Athletics and Fitness Association of America, broadening its scope to include group fitness instruction. NASM expanded its active overseas market and in 2016, Taiwan Creative Training Academy (CTA) became its agent and translated it into Traditional Chinese. In 2019, NASM acquired ClubConnect, an online platform providing education and training content, as well as business development and club management tools.

== Company timeline ==
- 1987: NASM is founded by Dr. Robert Goldman.
- 1998: Neal Spruce relocates NASM to California and integrates with Apex Fitness.
- 2000: Dr. Michael A. Clark joins as CEO and introduces the OPT Model.
- 2005: NASM receives NCCA Accreditation.
- 2006: Launch of Corrective Exercise Specialist and Performance Enhancement Specialist certifications.
- 2009: NASM becomes part of the Ascend Learning family of companies.
- 2012: Introduction of the Fitness Nutrition Certification.
- 2015: Acquisition of AFAA and the first Optima Conference.
- 2019: Acquisition of ClubConnect and launch of the Certified Nutrition Coach.
- 2022: Launch of the Certified Wellness Coach.

== Certificates and products ==
NASM offers a variety of certification programs for fitness and wellness professionals at different stages of their careers. These programs are based on an evidence-based approach and cover areas such as human movement science, biomechanics, and client-focused programming.

=== Fitness and performance certifications ===
- Certified Personal Trainer (CPT): NASM's flagship certification program, which covers client assessments, program design, human movement science, and basic nutrition.
- Performance Enhancement Specialist (PES): A certification for professionals working with athletes to improve performance using exercise science and sports psychology.
- Corrective Exercise Specialist (CES): A program for fitness professionals focusing on assessing and correcting movement imbalances to prevent injury.

=== Nutrition and wellness certifications ===
- Nutrition Certification: The Certified Nutrition Coach (CNC) program educates fitness professionals on nutrition science and behavior change techniques.
- Wellness Certification: NASM's Certified Wellness Coach (CWC) program includes courses such as the Wellness Coaching Simulation and the Wellness Coaching Business Blueprint, designed to enhance coaching skills and business growth.
- Behavior Change Specialization (BCS): A certification program that concentrates on the psychological aspects of fitness and wellness, aiming to foster long-term behavioral changes in clients.

=== Professional enablement tools ===
NASM provides various products, resources, and tools to support fitness and wellness professionals throughout their careers. These include NASM One, a membership platform offering ongoing support and education, and the NASM Edge app, a digital coaching tool for client management and business operations.

== Continuing education and accreditation ==
NASM emphasizes continuing education through advanced certifications and specialization courses. The organization is accredited by the National Commission for Certifying Agencies (NCCA), ensuring that its certification processes meet high standards of fairness, validity, and reliability.

NASM's educational programs are based on scientific research and industry best practices, with a focus on human movement science, biomechanics, and corrective exercise. The organization also utilizes digital tools to enhance the learning experience for its global community of professionals.

=== NASM Podcast Network ===
The NASM Podcast Network features a selection of podcasts hosted by industry professionals, providing education and insights into fitness, wellness, performance, and health.

== Global impact ==
NASM has certified professionals in over 100 countries and is recognized by major gym chains, health clubs, and sports organizations worldwide.

=== Industry leadership and advocacy ===
NASM advocates for policy and legislative changes that promote physical activity and improve public health. The organization participates in initiatives such as the NFL's Smart Heart Sports Coalition and supports military families by providing career opportunities in fitness and wellness.

Supporting military families

Since 2017, NASM has been recognized as a Military Friendly School, offering discounts on courses and military funding options for certifications, which enable military families to pursue rewarding careers as fitness professionals.

== Publications and research ==
NASM publishes resources like the textbook "NASM Essentials of Personal Fitness Training" and contributes to industry journals, sharing research and its application in fitness training.

== Notable NASM certified professionals ==
- Chris Powell
- Jillian Michaels

== See also ==
- Personal trainer
- Wellness coach
