= Feminine Forever =

1966 book by Robert A. Wilson

- Author: Robert A. Wilson
- Language: English
- Subject: Gynecology
- Publisher: M. Evans and Company
- Publication date: 1966
- Publication place: United States
- Pages: 224
- OCLC: 1109657

Feminine Forever is a 1966 book written by American gynecologist Robert A. Wilson. The book characterized menopause and associated symptoms as a serious disease state and strongly advocated the use of estrogen-based menopausal hormone therapy to alleviate it, maintain femininity and well-being, and improve quality of life and health. Wilson's claims were criticized as not being based on adequate research and evidence. Nonetheless, Wilson's book was marketed directly to women and was a best-seller, with it having been implicated in causing a rapid and large rise in prescriptions of menopausal hormone therapy. Subsequently, trials such as the Women's Health Initiative (WHI) contradicted Wilson's claims and showed that menopausal hormone therapy could have significant medical risks, such as venous thromboembolism and breast cancer, and that its benefits were not as great as once believed.

Decades after the book's publication, it was revealed that the manufacturer of the estrogen drug Premarin had secretly paid Wilson to promote its use by menopausal women.
