= Personal trainer =

Individual who provides others with fitness training and instruction

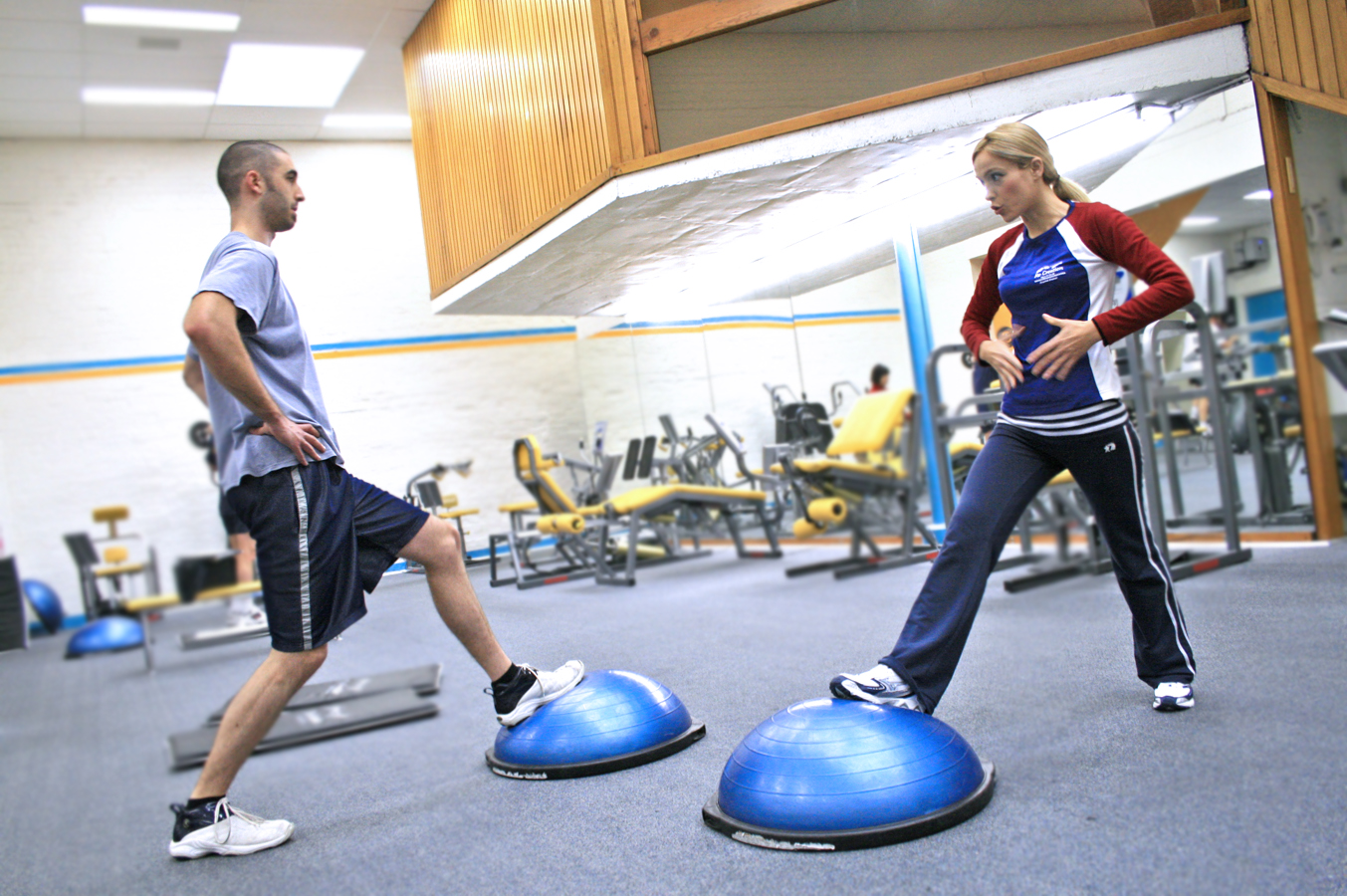
A personal trainer demonstrating use of a Bosu ball.

A personal trainer is an individual who creates and delivers safe and effective exercise programs for healthy individuals and groups, or those with medical clearance to exercise. They motivate clients by collaborating to set goals, providing meaningful feedback, and by being a reliable source for accountability. Trainers also conduct a variety of assessments beginning with a preparticipation health-screening and may also include assessments of posture and movement, flexibility, balance, core function, cardio-respiratory fitness, muscular fitness, body composition, and skill-related parameters (e.g. power, agility, coordination, speed, and reactivity) to observe and gather relevant information needed to develop an effective exercise program and support client goal attainment.

These assessments may be performed at the beginning of and after an exercise program to measure client progress toward improved physical fitness. Trainers create exercise programs following a progression model, using the baseline assessment as the starting point of a client's physical abilities and framing the program to fit the individual personally. They also provide education on many other aspects of wellness, including general health and nutrition guidelines. Helping clients to reach their full potential in various aspects of life requires a comprehensive client-centered approach along with a belief that clients are resourceful and capable of change.

Qualified personal trainers or certified personal trainers (CPTs) recognize their own areas of expertise. If a trainer suspects that one of their clients has a medical condition that could prevent the client from safe participation in an exercise program, they must refer the client to the proper health professional for medical clearance.

== Purpose of personal training ==
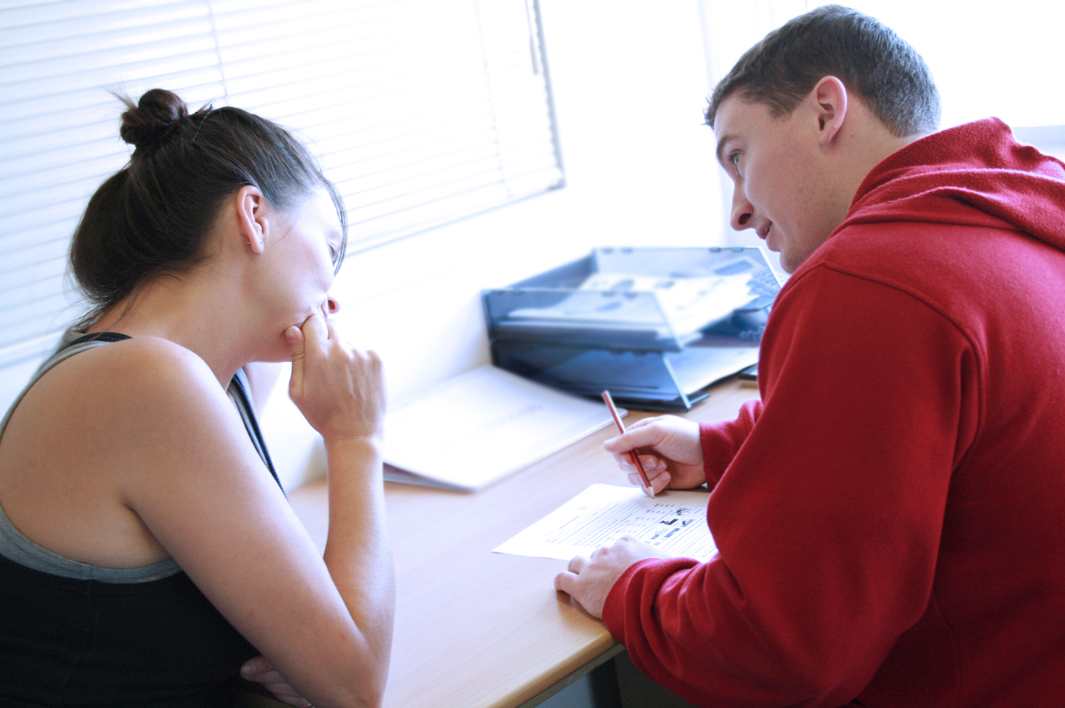
Personal trainer assessing a client's goals and needs as they write a fitness program

The scope of practice for a personal trainer has a primary focus on prevention and involves enhancing components of health and fitness for the general, healthy population or those cleared for exercise.

Proper exercise prescription may result in improved body composition, physical performance, heart condition, and health outcomes. The decision to hire a personal trainer may be related to a perceived health threat, a lack of knowledge, a personal belief in one's ability to begin and adhere to an exercise program, or some sort of psychological effect. Often clients will seek the guidance of a personal trainer for factors related to motivation and adherence. A personal trainer pays close attention to the client's exercise technique, workout routine, goals, values, and nutrition. Personal training in men and women has been shown to improve the benefit-to-concern ratio for exercise (decisional balance), and increase confidence to choose exercise in the face of other time demands (scheduling self-efficacy). Personal training results in higher strength, higher workout intensities, and higher perceived exertion during exercise.

== Employment characteristics ==
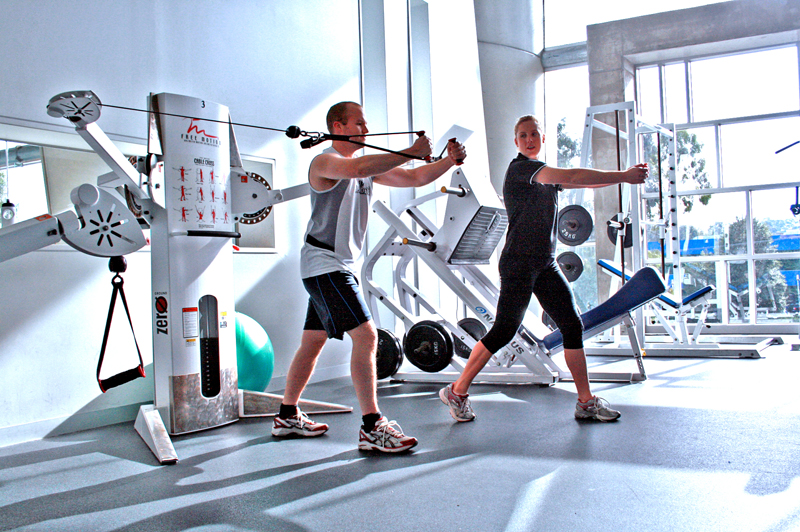
Personal trainer working with a client in a fitness center

The profession is generally not restricted by the venue, and personal trainers may work in fitness facilities, in their own homes, in client homes, over live video (also called "virtual personal trainers"), or outdoors. Almost all exercise professionals work in physical fitness facilities, health clubs, and fitness centers located in the amusement and recreation industry or in civic and social organizations. Personal training is not regulated in any jurisdiction in the United States except for Washington D.C. which adopted registration requirements for personal fitness trainers in February 2014. Some employers, such as gyms, require personal trainers to be certified. However, this is not always the case and some personal trainers can find work without certification. Overall, personal trainers must possess certain skills, such as a passion for fitness and helping others achieve their goals, industry knowledge, leadership, and the ability to communicate effectively with their clients.

Personal trainers may specialize in a certain training type, training philosophy, performance type, exercise modality, or client population. In general, most personal trainers develop exercise plans for aerobic exercise, resistance exercise, and/or flexibility training. With aerobic exercise prescription, personal trainers determine the type of exercise, duration of exercise, and frequency of exercise. For resistance exercise prescription, the type of exercise, total session volume, rest period, frequency, and intensity are determined. Personal trainers may also be involved in the prescription of stretching routines or other approaches. Personal trainers help clients to perform exercises with correct techniques, minimizing the risk of injury. While some discuss nutrition, ergogenic supplementation, and spiritual practices with clients, there is debate within the industry as to whether it fits within their scope of practice and training qualifications.

== Accreditation ==
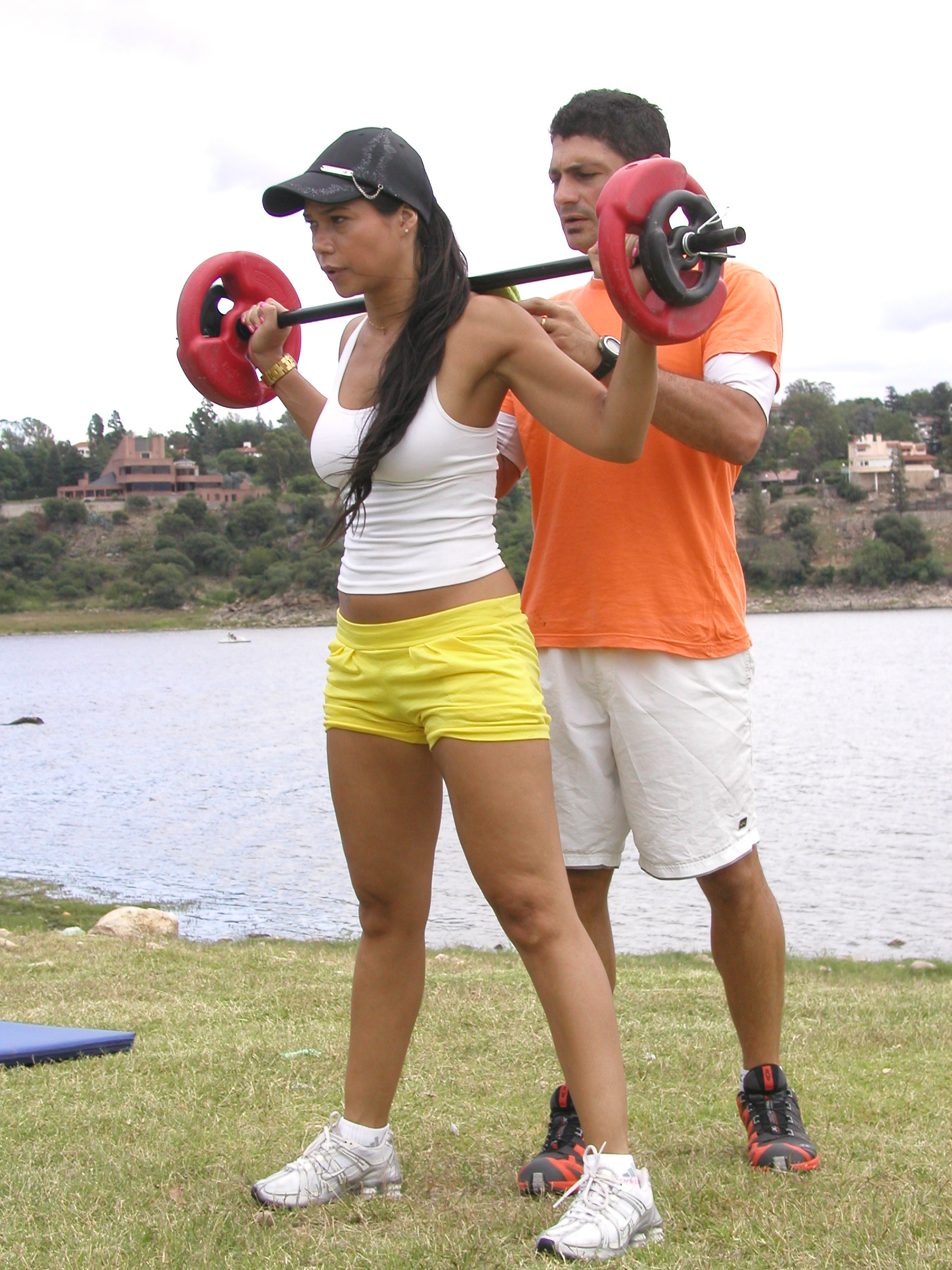
Personal training outdoors

Personal trainer accreditation is a process that provides certification of competency. Qualification standards for personal trainers vary between countries. Personal trainer accreditation is also viewed as experience in the field with many client testimonials on their achievements working with their personal trainer.

=== International ===
The International Confederation of Registers for Exercise Professionals (ICREPs) is an international partnership between registration bodies around the world that register exercise professionals. Member countries conform to the international standards set by ICREPs for personal training (and other exercise education credentials) and are transferable to other member countries. The current members of ICREPs (as of 2019) are: Fitness Australia, NFLA Canada, REPs India, REPs Ireland, REPs New Zealand, REPs Poland, REPs South Africa, REPs United Arab Emirates, USREPs, and IranREPs.

=== Australia ===
In Australia, personal trainers may work independently with suitable insurance or choose to be a member of a registering body (Fitness Australia or Physical Activity Australia). The qualifications levels include; Level 1 - Certificate III in Fitness, Level 2 - Certificate IV in Fitness and Level 3 - Diploma of Fitness. These can be obtained from nationally accredited colleges (TAFE, Australian College of Sport & Fitness, Fitness Industry Training, Global Fitness Institute, Australian Institute of Fitness, Australian Fitness Academy). Once working in the industry, trainers who are members of associations are also required to complete short courses to obtain continuing education credit (CEC) points they need to keep their registration. A minimum of 20 CEC points every two years is required. Many personal trainers also have additional qualifications in weight loss, strength training, kid's fitness, and nutrition, which is in part due to the CEC program. CEC courses can cover a wide variety of topics such as different training techniques, nutrition, exercise styles, health conditions, physiology, lifestyle, and rehabilitation.

Once members obtain their Australian Cert III & IV in Fitness, they can practice nationally. This can be done with this certification and using the Global Portability Matrix. The Global Portability Matrix was designed by ICREPS. This stands for International Confederation of Registers for Exercise Professionals, which allows all members to practice in other countries. Members can train in Belgium, The Netherlands, Hungary, The United Kingdom, Ireland, Lebanon, Poland, The United States, The Caribbean, South Africa, United Arab Emirates, Canada, and New Zealand.

=== Brazil ===
In Brazil, personal trainers must have a bachelor's degree in "Physical Education" (a degree that combines knowledge in the fields of Exercise Science and Healthcare science) and be registered with the Conselho Federal de Educação Física (Federal Council of Physical Education), and risk criminal charges if they operate without these two requirements.

=== Canada ===
In Canada, the main certifying bodies are Canadian Fitness Education Services (CFES), Canadian Fitness Professionals (CanFit Pro), Certified Personal Trainers Network, the Canadian Society of Exercise Physiology (CSEP), and the National Fitness Leadership Association (NFLA). CSEP requires a diploma or degree in the exercise field, most other organizations require experience and/or workshops to qualify for a credential. Many personal trainers receive a CFES, CanFit Pro, NFLA or an NCCA accredited certification, but there are no certifications required by law. Fitness instruction in Canada is an unregulated industry.

=== Iran ===
In Iran, the main certifying bodies are IranREPs and Bodybuilding Federation which these two organizations signed a memorandum of understanding in the beginning of 2019. IranREPs requires a diploma or degree in the exercise field from EuropeActive accredited providers or Sport universities. IranREPs joined the ICREPs in 2020.

=== Europe ===
In Europe, personal trainers may work independently, but will always need accreditation by one of the main certifying bodies such as:

EREPS: The European Register of Exercise Professionals (EREPS) is an independent process for the registering of instructors, trainers and teachers working in the European health, fitness and physical activity sector. It is a pan-European system, based on independent national registers, which culminate in a central European database.

=== New Zealand ===
New Zealand has one major registration body for exercise professionals – REPs New Zealand. REPs New Zealand is recognised by both Exercise New Zealand (the industry association) and ICREPs.

REPs NZ currently have three major registration categories

1: Exercise Prescription

2: Group Exercise

3: Yoga Teacher

To be eligible to register for REPs you need to have one the below options

a) Completed an initial qualification from a REPs registered Provider

b) Complete a NZ University Degree with an Exercise focus

c) Hold a NZ Certificate in Exercise 4

d) Hold current registration with an ICREPs partner

To maintain your REPs registration you will need to

a) Renew your registration yearly

b) Keep your CPR and First Aid up to date and valid

c) Complete 10CPD points per year

=== United Kingdom ===
In the UK, there are several ways to achieve a personal training qualification. The standard required in the UK is Level 3 Personal Training to become a personal trainer. Most personal training qualifications are accredited through awarding bodies like Active IQ, Focus Awards, CIMSPA, YMCA Awards, VTCT and City and Guilds. These qualifications are generally delivered by Further Education (FE) establishments like colleges, or by private training providers. Upon successful completion of an accredited awarding body qualification, candidates become eligible for CIMSPA Practitioner status.

There is no legal restriction on the title of Personal Trainer nor any formal body associated with regulating Personal Training.

=== United States ===
A number of certifications are available in the U.S., although a number are not accredited. Most require a high school diploma, cardiopulmonary resuscitation (CPR) and automated external defibrillator (AED) certification, and some type of examination.

The United States Registry of Exercise Professionals (USREPS) is the official registry of exercise professionals in the United States and provides clients, employers, healthcare practitioners, policymakers, and insurance providers a single source for finding well-qualified exercise professionals or to verify credentials.

A 2002 investigation evaluated a random sample of 115 personal trainers using the Fitness Instructors Knowledge Assessment (FIKA) (which measures knowledge in nutrition, health screening, testing protocols, exercise prescription, and special populations). The study described that:

- 70% of those surveyed did not have a degree in any field related to exercise science.
- Those who did not have a bachelor's degree in an exercise science-related field scored 31% less on average than those with a bachelor's degree or higher in the field.
- Those holding one of two specific certifications (the American College of Sports Medicine (ACSM) or the National Strength and Conditioning Association (NSCA) certification) scored 83% of the questions correctly on average. Those holding any certification other than ACSM or NSCA answered only 38% of the questions correctly.
- Years of experience was not found to be predictive of personal trainer knowledge.

In partnership with the fitness industry, the International Health, Racquet & Sportsclub Association (IHRSA), which represents over 9,000 health and fitness facilities, started an initiative in 2002 to improve standards for both its own clubs and the industry as a whole. In January 2006, IHRSA implemented a recommendation that its facilities only accept personal trainers with certifications recognized by the National Commission for Certifying Agencies (NCCA) if recognized either by the Council for Higher Education Accreditation (CHEA) and/or the U.S. Department of Education (USDE). As a result, the Distance Education Accrediting Commission (DEAC) was recognized by IHRSA as a recognized accreditor of fitness professional certification organizations. Since then, the DEAC has accredited several personal trainer certification organizations, including the Athletics and Fitness Association of America (AFAA) and the International Sports Sciences Association (ISSA) among others. As of now, NASM, ISSA, AFAA, ACSM, ACE, and NSCA certifications are among the 16 accredited certifications recognized by IHRSA, three of which are accredited by the Distance Education Accrediting Commission (DEAC).

There remains no national legal restriction on the industry to date except for the District of Columbia (D.C.) which as of February 2014, passed legislation requiring personal fitness trainers to register in that jurisdiction.

=== India ===
Personal Trainers in India must hold an appropriate Certification in Personal Training from respected organizations such as Active IQ, National Academy of Sports Medicine (NASM), National Strength and Conditioning Association (NSCA), National Exercise and Sports Trainer Association (NESTA), National Council on Strength and Fitness (NCSF) and The International Sports Sciences Association(ISSA). Apart from all these International certifications, if one holds any National Skill Qualification Framework Certifications (NSQF Certificates) such as Level 4 Fitness Trainer, Level 5 Personal Fitness Trainer, Level 6 Strength and Conditioning and Diploma in Personal Training from REPS India, will also provide an opportunity to work as a personal trainer in India. Any additional continuing educational courses such as Corrective Exercise Specialist, Special Population Trainer, Weight loss Specialist, Reebok Crossfit, LesMills Bodypump and Yoga Trainer will yield an individual further benefits of salary escalation. To work in India, Personal trainers do not have to register as an Exercise Professional to get employment.

== See also ==
- Physical exercise
- Physical fitness
- Physical training instructor
- Nutritionist
- Professional fitness coach
