= Journal of Endocrinological Investigation =

- Discipline: Endocrinology
- Language: English
- Edited by: Luigi Bartalena

Publication details
- History: 1978–present
- Publisher: Springer Science+Business Media
- Frequency: Monthly
- Impact factor: 3.166 (2017)

Standard abbreviations
- ISO 4: J. Endocrinol. Investig.
- NLM: J Endocrinol Invest

Indexing
- CODEN: JEIND7
- ISSN: 0391-4097 (print); 1720-8386 (web)
- OCLC no.: 977674552

Links
- Journal homepage; Online archive

The Journal of Endocrinological Investigation is a monthly peer-reviewed medical journal covering endocrinology. It was established in 1978 and is published by Springer Science+Business Media on behalf of the Italian Society of Endocrinology, of which it is the official journal. The editor-in-chief is Luigi Bartalena (University of Insubria). According to the Journal Citation Reports, the journal has a 2017 impact factor of 3.166.
