= ApothéCure =

Pharmacy in the United States

- Industry: Pharmaceutical
- Founded: 1991 (35 years ago) in Dallas, Texas
- Defunct: 2013; 13 years ago
- Headquarters: Dallas, Texas, U.S.

ApothéCure was a Dallas, Texas-based compounding pharmacy that specialized in custom compounded formulas and nutritional supplements for both patients and physicians. ApothéCure was a sister corporation of the Texas Institute of Functional Medicines. The company was the subject of multiple lawsuits starting in the mid-2000s.

== History ==
ApothéCure was founded by Gary Osborn in 1991 in Dallas, Texas. In 2010, Osborn founded NuVision Pharmacy and it opened for business in 2011. The business was shut down in 2013.

== Litigation ==
ApothéCure was investigated in 2004 following complaints that its compounds (testosterone and growth hormones) may have been illegally dispensed to patients, including a pregnant woman. Pharmacy board officials found insufficient evidence to discipline the company, but issued a letter of warning. Also in 2004, the Pennsylvania Department of Health issued a statewide alert after three Pennsylvania patients had reactions following intravenous injections of the ApothéCure-supplied drug phosphatidylcholine.

In 2005, ApothéCure was one of several parties sued over the fatal administration of disodium EDTA to an autistic five-year-old boy. Dr. Roy Kerry prescribed the drug for chelation therapy, which some people believe is helpful to treat autism. However, this usage is not approved by the U.S. Food and Drug Administration (FDA).

In 2007, ApothéCure was implicated in the deaths of three patients from the Pacific Northwest. The patients were each given intravenous colchicine, a substance commonly used in naturopathic medicine, for treatment of back pain (an off-label use of the drug). Colchicine can be very toxic when given in high doses; due to incorrect labeling, the colchicine the patients received was ten times more concentrated than listed on the vials, resulting in toxic doses. Over 3,500 vials of the drug, distributed nationwide, were recalled.

In 2007, attorneys general in Oregon and Texas filed lawsuits against ApothéCure Inc. and the company's owner, Gary Osborn of Dallas, Texas. The case is being jointly prosecuted between Oregon Attorney General Hardy Myers and Texas Attorney General Greg Abbott, asserting that "the company failed to follow standard safety practices and exceeded their authorized scope of practice as a compounding pharmacy". According to Meyers, ApotheCure's error reflected a pattern of substandard care and was not an isolated incident. The Texas suit alleges that the pharmacy "failed to use proper manufacturing practices, employed incorrect labels and made exaggerated claims about the benefits of its dietary supplements."

In the 2007 deaths, there may have been several violations committed, including ApothéCure being unlicensed to sell drugs in Oregon. In the year and a half prior, ApothéCure made 44 total sales of injectable colchicine to Oregon health professionals without a license to distribute in Oregon. ApothéCure reached a settlement with the Oregon attorney general in April 2008. The settlement requires ApothéCure to pay $100,000 to the state, and a $500,000 civil penalty if the company wishes to sell products in Oregon again. ApothéCure must also refund money from all of its 222 sales to Oregon consumers from 2004 through 2007.

Wrongful death lawsuits were also filed against ApothéCure by the families of two of the colchicine victims; both families reached confidential settlements with ApothéCure, while the third family is negotiating a settlement with the company.

In 2012, the United States Department of Justice charged ApothéCure Inc. and its owner, Osborn, with two misdemeanor criminal violations of the Federal Food, Drug and Cosmetic Act. These charges were in connection with the misbranding which led to the three deaths in the Pacific Northwest. Osborn and his corporation pleaded guilty to these charges. Osborn was sentenced to home detention, one year of probation, and a $100,000 fine. Separately, the company was sentenced to five years of probation and a $100,000 fine.
