= Naval Anti-Ship Missile =

Naval Anti-Ship Missile (NASM) may refer to:

- NASM-MR, a medium-range missile
- NASM-SR, a short-range missile

== See also ==
- NASAMS, a surface-to-air missile system
