= Robert M. Goldman =

American physician

- Other names: 'Bob' Goldman
- Occupations: Physician, academic, sports and physical culture advocate
- Known for: Sports medicine Anti-aging and regenerative medicine Martial Arts
- Website: drbobgoldman.com

Robert M. Goldman is an American physician, author, martial artist, sports and physical culture advocate, teacher, historian and an expert in sports medicine and anti-aging and regenerative medicine. He served as a Senior Fellow at the Lincoln Filene Center at Tufts University and an Affiliate at the Graduate School of Education, Harvard University. He is also known as a co-founder of the American Academy of Anti-Aging Medicine (A4M), the founder of the International Sports Hall of Fame and Founder/President Emeritus of NASM (National Academy of Sports Medicine).

== Career ==
Goldman earned the first of his two PhDs in 'Androgenic Anabolic Steroid Biochemistry' and pioneered the development of drug testing protocols for the IFBB, NPC and Olympic Games. His second PhD in sports medicine/Health Sciences, ultimately led to the establishment of the 'High Technology Fitness Research Institute' in Chicago, Illinois which scientifically assessed all types of fitness equipment.

Goldman also holds an MD and a DO and oversaw Cooperative Research & Development Agreements (CRADAs) with NASA, FDA, American National Red Cross, SRI (Stanford Research Institute) and US Department of Defense.

During his younger days, Goldman was an all-college athlete in four sports and developed special interest in physical strength and calisthenics. He started to break strength world records at the age of 14, and Guinness World Records credits Goldman with over 20 world records including 13,500 consecutive straight leg sit-ups and 321 consecutive handstand push-ups. Goldman is also an avid martial artist and a recipient of ninth degree black belt in Tang Soo Do, sixth degree black belts in Shotokan, ninth degree black belt in Karate and Kung Fu and also an expert in Chinese weapons.

Goldman served as the chairman of the International Medical Commission for over 30 years, overseeing sports medicine committees in over 194 countries. He co-founded the American Academy of Anti-Aging Medicine (A4M) with Dr. Ronald M. Klatz and founded the National Academy of Sports Medicine (NASM) and Tarsus Medical Group.

He also served as a council member of the President's Council on Sports, Fitness & Nutrition under several US presidents. Goldman is a member of the editorial boards of over a dozen medical journals and holds visiting professorships at numerous medical universities around the world.

In addition to his institutional affiliations, Goldman has contributed to the development of intellectual property in the medical and fitness fields, holding patents dating to the early 1990s.

He has been associated with a portfolio of more than 150 medical patents, primarily in areas including trauma and emergency medicine, organ transplantation, blood preservation, and brain resuscitation. He personally authored a portion of these patents, while others were developed by scientists under his supervision, including work conducted in collaboration with institutions such as the American National Red Cross, U.S. Food and Drug Administration (FDA), NASA, SRI International and the Naval Medical Research Institute. He has also authored more than 50 books.

Goldman is also the founder and chairman of the International Sports Hall of Fame which honours world's greatest athlete legends and luminaries in all categories of sports. From 2012 to 2025, 79 distinguished individuals have been inducted into the International Sports Hall of Fame. For his lifetime contributions to the fitness industry, sports performance and its promotion, Arnold Schwarzenegger bestowed his 'Arnold Classic Lifetime Achievement Award' of 2018 to Goldman.
