= Athletics and Fitness Association of America =

Fitness education company in Arizona, USA

- Founded: 1983
- Headquarters: Gilbert, Arizona
- Website: afaa.com

The Athletics and Fitness Association of America (AFAA) is a fitness education company that was established in 1983, and operates out of Gilbert, Arizona. The company was previously known as the Aerobics and Fitness Association of America, but changed its name in July 2016. Currently AFAA operates in 73 countries with over 350,000 certifications.

== International operations ==
AFAA has expanded the company in Japan, and more recently China. AFAA China held their first workshops at Nirvana Gym in Beijing, China with 50 participants. AFAA Japan was first introduced in 1988 and there are 180 AFAA educational faculty members in Japan.

== See also ==
- Personal Trainer
