= Women's Health Initiative =

Long-term U.S. health study

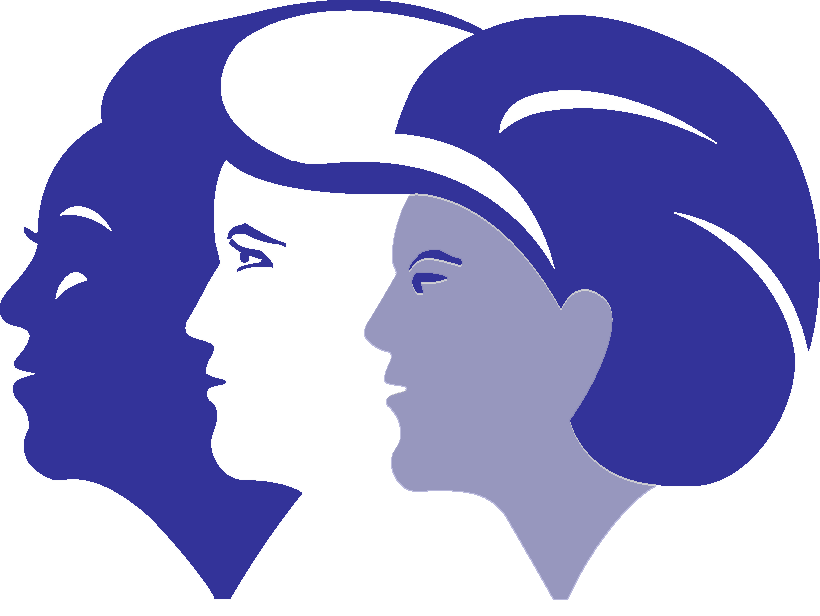
Logo for the Women's Health Initiative (WHI)

The Women's Health Initiative (WHI) was a series of clinical studies initiated by the U.S. National Institutes of Health (NIH) in 1991, to address major health issues causing morbidity and mortality in postmenopausal women. It consisted of three clinical trials (CT) and an observational study (OS). In particular, randomized controlled trials were designed and funded that addressed cardiovascular disease, cancer, and osteoporosis. The study was not designed to assess the use of hormone therapy for menopausal vasomotor symptoms.

In its entirety, the WHI enrolled more than 160,000 postmenopausal women aged 50–79 years (at time of study enrollment) over 15 years, making it one of the largest U.S. prevention studies of its kind, with a budget of $625 million. Interim monitoring of the combined estrogen/progestin treatment group indicated an increased risk of breast cancer, coronary heart disease, stroke, and pulmonary embolism, which outweighed the evidence indicating a benefit in preventing colorectal cancer and fractures. Systemic hormone therapy has decreased dramatically among U.S. women since the preliminary WHI results were published. It was reported that breast cancer rates declined rapidly in association with reduced use of hormone therapy.

However, those initial conclusions, which led to a massive impact on clinical practice, have been challenged as inaccurate based on further analysis of the findings and subsequent studies. Distorted reporting on the WHI results may have overstated concerns about potential increases in breast cancer incidence and other risks. Even if the Women's Health Initiative statistics on the risk of breast cancer were correct, that would translate to one additional case of non-fatal breast cancer for every 1,000 women treated per year. Reanalyses of WHI data have indicated that, when other risk factors for breast cancer were taken into account, the reported association between hormone therapy and increased breast cancer rates was not statistically significant. The question of long-term safety risks remains controversial with other experts warning there may be a slight increase in breast cancer that should not be overlooked. According to a cumulative 18-year follow-up analysis published in 2017, it was found that, among 27,347 postmenopausal women who had originally participated in the WHI hormone therapy trials, interventions using estrogen-plus-progestin and estrogen-alone were not associated with increased or decreased risk of all-cause, cardiovascular, or total cancer mortality. Estrogen therapy alone was associated with reduced risk of developing or dying from breast cancer.

Initial interpretation and communication about the WHI study findings have also been criticized for failing to clarify that the study was weighted toward women already 60 or older (average age 63). This meant that women in their 50s, who tend to be healthier and have more menopausal symptoms, were underrepresented. Current professional guidelines now describe HRT as the most effective treatment for vasomotor symptoms and the genitourinary syndrome of menopause and note that for women under the age of 60 or within 10 years of menopause onset and no contraindications, the benefit-to-risk ratio is likely to favor its use for vasomotor symptoms and prevention of bone loss.

== Motivation for the expanded study of women's health ==
In the 1980s, it had become apparent that past biomedical research had focused disproportionately on white men, often neglecting prevention and treatment studies of diseases that are either unique to or more common in women and minorities. In 1985, the Public Health Service Task Force on Women's Health Issues issued recommendations that biomedical and behavioral research should be expanded to provide for the inclusion diseases and conditions identified among women of all age groups. In 1986, the NIH issued recommendations that women be included in all research studies. To further promote the study of women, in 1990, the NIH created the Office of Research on Women's Health.

In 1990, however, a report was published by the General Accounting Office (GAO), at the request of the Congressional Caucus on Women's Issues, which stated that this NIH policy was not being adequately applied to research grant applications. As a consequence, beginning in 1991, NIH strengthened the policy to require, rather than recommend, the inclusion of women in clinical research (when appropriate) in order to obtain funding.

It was these changes in societal attitudes and policy toward women's health research, in addition to the demonstration that such a large study was not only feasible, but could be done economically, that gave rise to the WHI.

== WHI study antecedents and demonstration of feasibility for a large-scale intervention study ==
Among postmenopausal women, cardiovascular disease, cancer, and osteoporosis are the leading causes of morbidity and mortality, as well as impaired quality of life. Among women in all age groups, cancer and cardiovascular disease are the leading causes of mortality. As the incidence of these diseases increases according to age, women over the age of 50 bear much of the disease burden.

It had been generally accepted that postmenopausal estrogen deficiency may play a role in these morbidities, and that dietary, behavioral, and drug interventions may forestall their development. However, these findings were identified on the basis of epidemiologic observational studies alone. Such interventions would require testing through clinical trials before they, along with their full range of risks and benefits, could be used as the basis for setting public health policy and creating prevention guidelines.

However, concerns existed about the feasibility of such a complex clinical trial among participants in this demographic of older women, particularly with respect to sufficient recruitment and adherence to the dietary and hormone-treatment regimens.

In 1987, the NIH funded the Postmenopausal Estrogen/Progestin Intervention (PEPI). The trial followed 875 women who underwent treatment with estrogen, estrogen and progestin, or placebo, and — even quite early in the study — demonstrated both successful recruitment and participant retention/adherence in a hormone therapy (HT) setting. Many of the operational procedures from PEPI, including the study drug dosing, were retained in the larger WHI-HT clinical trial.

In 1984, the NIH provided funding for a feasibility study pertaining to diet adherence, conducted by the Women's Health Trial (WHT). The WHT, which commenced in 1986 and involved 303 women randomized into dietary intervention and control groups, yielded results demonstrating a high degree of adherence on the basis of both food-intake questionnaires and clinical laboratory findings. The WHT did not proceed with its full-scale trial, as it was not awarded further funding from the NIH on the basis of the potential inability of the study to test the hypothesis in a larger cohort of women. In 1990, however, interest in the impact of diet on cancer and cardiovascular disease in women was renewed, and a joint National Cancer Institute (NCI)-National Heart, Lung, and Blood Institute (NHLBI) workshop concluded that a full-scale dietary trial, with a focus on these two diseases, was warranted.

=== WHI study announced and planning begins ===
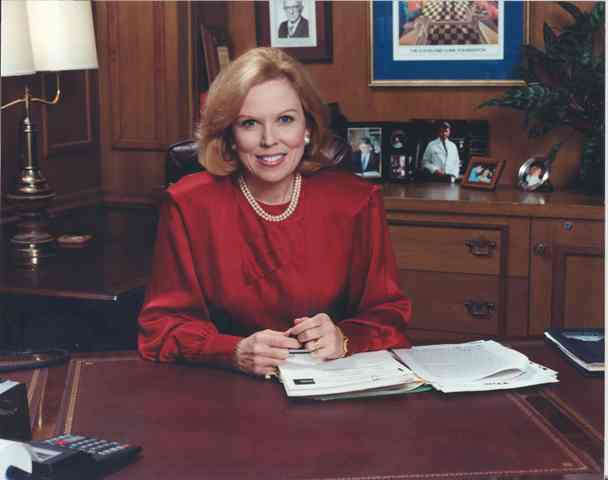
Former NIH Director Bernadine Healy

On April 19, 1991, Dr. Bernadine Healy, newly appointed as the first female director of the NIH, announced her plan for the Women's Health Initiative (WHI). Planning for the WHI CT/OS study began that year. In order to promote cross-institutional collaboration, and to prevent the loss of funding to other women's health-related studies, funding was requested and obtained directly from Congress in the form of a discrete line item, with a projected budget of $625 million over the life of the 15-year study.

The NIH awarded the role of Clinical Coordinating Center (CCC) to the Fred Hutchinson Cancer Research Center (FHCRC), located in Seattle, Washington. The CCC's responsibilities included the coordination of the 40 study clinics that would eventually recruit women nationwide, as well as ensuring their consistent adherence to the study design and guidelines.

== Design overview, eligibility, and enrollment ==
In 1991, working groups were formed to determine the study plan for both the clinical trials (CT) and the observational study (OS). These groups included experts from diverse arenas of medicine, public health, and clinical trial design from both within and outside the NIH.

=== Study organization and implementation ===
Given the complexity of the WHI study, both in terms of the number of interventions and outcomes studied, as well as the number and geographic distribution of participants and clinical centers, careful orchestration was required. To this end, the WHI maintained a carefully designed organizational structure, along with governance- and science-specific committees and communications channels for staff and investigators to resolve study-related questions and exchange information. As the study launched concurrently with the early stages of modern Internet connectivity, the study centers had to be supplied with computing and networking equipment to connect to the WHI network; WHI-hosted e-mail facilitated the efficient exchange of information among staff and scientists, as well as the transfer of study-related data.

The launch of the study was undertaken in two stages. At first, 16 "vanguard" study centers entered active operation, to evaluate the study protocol and procedures. Once this initial portion of the study was underway, the remaining 24 study centers entered the study around a year later, each assigned to one of the "vanguard" study centers for purposes of mentorship. Study centers were subdivided into four regions, each under the supervision of a regional center, to further facilitate communication and information exchange among study centers.

=== Eligibility and enrollment ===
The WHI study recruited postmenopausal women in the 50-79 age range, and sought to be as inclusive as practical. The wide nature of the age range balanced the need to observe the effects of hormone therapy on younger women, while also attempting to capture physical and cognitive outcomes in older populations. In addition, a 20% minority enrollment rate was set for all components, to accurately represent the proportion of minorities within the study demographic (17% at the time of the 1990 U.S. Census). To achieve this, 10 of the 40 WHI clinical centers were designated as minority recruitment centers, with enhanced minority recruitment goals.

Eligibility and exclusion criteria also were defined, both study-wide and component-specific. Global inclusion criteria included postmenopausal women, between 50 and 79 years of age, who were willing and able to provide written consent, and who planned to reside in the study recruitment for a least three years after enrollment. Global exclusion criteria included medical conditions that would be predictive of a survival of less than three years, possessing characteristics or conditions that may diminish study adherence (e.g., substance abuse, mental illness, or cognitive impairment), or concurrent enrollment in another randomized controlled clinical trial.

For the CT, a partial factorial study design was utilized for the investigation of three overlapping interventions (dietary modification, hormone therapy, and calcium/vitamin D supplementation), as this would provide considerable cost efficiencies. Willing study-eligible women were asked to join either the hormone therapy (HT trial), the dietary modification (DM) trial, or both. After one year, willing and eligible CT participants were also asked to join the calcium/vitamin D trial (CaD).

Recruitment goals for the HT, DM, and CaD components of the CT were 27,500, 48,000, and 45,000, respectively, each obtained on the basis of calculations of statistical power with regard to the outcomes of interest for each component.

Participants who either did not qualify for or declined to participate in the CT were, if eligible and willing to consent, enrolled in the observational study (OS), which had an enrollment goal of 100,000.

== Study components and primary findings ==
The WHI study was composed of four study components, to include three overlapping clinical trial (CT) interventions and one observational study (OS). Component enrollment and the primary findings are summarized in the following two tables, respectively, with additional detail following subsequently:

Enrollment summary
	Intervention				
Age group	DM	HT w/ E+P	HT w/ E-alone	CaD	OS
50–54 years	6961 (16%)	2029 (14%)	1396 (15%)	5157 (16%)	12386 (15%)
55–59 years	11043 (25%)	3492 (23%)	1916 (20%)	8265 (25%)	17321 (20%)
60–69 years	22713 (52%)	7512 (50%)	4852 (50%)	16520 (51%)	41196 (49%)
70–79 years	8118 (19%)	3574 (24%)	2575 (26%)	6340 (19%)	22773 (26%)
Total	48835	16608	10739	36282	93676
Abbreviations: E+P: combined estrogen plus progestin therapy. E-alone: estrogen monotherapy.

Summary of findings
CT Component	Hypothesized Impact on Primary Outcome Based on previous observational, pilot, and/or laboratory studies	Supported by WHI CT Findings?	Notes
Hormone Therapy	Reduces risk of coronary heart disease (CHD).	No	Increased risk of stroke. No effect on CHD risk.
Hormone Therapy	Increases risk of breast cancer.	Varies by regimen	Estrogen-progestin combination therapy increased risk. Estrogen-alone therapy showed a possible decrease in risk.
Dietary Modification	Reduces risks of CHD, stroke, and cardiovascular disease (CVD).	No	Modest, but non-significant, effects on CVD risk factors.
Dietary Modification	Reduces risk of invasive colorectal cancer.	No	Non-significant trend indicated that a longer intervention may yield more definitive results.
Dietary Modification	Reduces risk of invasive breast cancer.	No	Subgroup analyses suggested that the dietary intervention significantly lowered risk of breast cancer among women with a higher baseline percentage of energy from fat.
Calcium plus Vitamin D	Reduces risk of hip and other fractures.	No	A small, but significant, improvement in bone mineral density was identified.
Calcium plus Vitamin D	Reduces risk of colorectal cancer.	No	Study notes that a longer-duration study may yield more definitive results.

=== Hormone therapy ===
The design of the hormone therapy trial (HT) was approached with the hypothesis that estrogen therapy would result in a decrease in coronary heart disease and osteoporosis-related fractures. As such, the primary outcome of interest was coronary heart disease, as this is a major cause of morbidity and mortality among women, particularly those over age 65, and because, at the time, no clinical trial had been undertaken to prove the cardioprotective effects of HT. Due to the concern over the relationship between HT and elevated breast cancer risk, breast cancer was selected as the primary adverse outcome. Additional outcomes monitored included stroke, pulmonary embolism (PE), endometrial cancer, colorectal cancer, hip fracture, and death due to other causes. The study was not designed to assess the use of hormone therapy for menopausal vasomotor symptoms.

Two regimens were selected, in addition to a placebo group. Women assigned to the intervention group who had previously undergone a hysterectomy were treated with unopposed estrogen, specifically conjugated estrogens (Premarin, manufactured by Wyeth), at a dosage of 0.625 mg/day ("E-alone," n = 5310; placebo, n = 5429). Women with an intact uterus were treated by a combined estrogen plus progestin regimen ("E+P," n = 8506; placebo, n = 8102), specifically the aforementioned estrogen regimen with the addition of 2.5 mg/day of medroxyprogesterone acetate (MPA; Prempro, also manufactured by Wyeth). The addition of progestin has been linked to a marked reduction in the risk for the development of endometrial cancer in women receiving estrogen treatment who have not undergone a hysterectomy.

In addition to the global exclusion criteria, women were ineligible for the HT component if safety was a concern. Such concerns included a breast cancer diagnosis at any time in the past, other cancers (excluding non-melanoma skin cancer) diagnosed within the previous 10 years, or low hematocrit or platelet counts.

==== HT component findings and ensuing events ====
The HT component had originally been designed to include a follow-up period of nine years. However, interim monitoring of the combined estrogen/progestin treatment group indicated an increased risk of breast cancer, coronary heart disease, stroke, and pulmonary embolism, which outweighed the evidence indicating a benefit in preventing colorectal cancer and fractures. As a consequence, the HT study pills were stopped in July 2002, with an average follow-up period of 5.2 years. The unopposed estrogen trial was halted in February 2004, after an average follow-up period of 6.8 years, on the basis that unopposed estrogen did not appear to affect the risk of heart disease, the primary outcome, which was in contrast to the findings of previous observational studies. On the other hand, there were indications for an increased risk of stroke. Unopposed estrogen did reduce the risk for osteoporotic fractures and, unlike the estrogen/progestin treatment, showed a decrease in breast cancer risk.

As a consequence of the findings, which indicated that the incurred risks of HT outweigh the identified benefits, the study authors recommended that HT not be prescribed for the purpose of chronic disease prevention in postmenopausal women.

The hypothesized and observed risks of specific clinical outcomes are summarized in the following table. Of particular interest are the contrasts between several of the hypothesized risks and the observed attributable risks, which are instructive in demonstrating the distinct differences between the HT trial findings and those of previous observational studies.

Results of the Women's Health Initiative (WHI) menopausal hormone therapy randomized controlled trials
Clinical outcome	Hypothesized effect on risk	Estrogen and progestogen (CEs 0.625 mg/day p.o. + MPA 2.5 mg/day p.o.) (n = 16,608, with uterus, 5.2–5.6 years follow up)			Estrogen alone (CEs 0.625 mg/day p.o.) (n = 10,739, no uterus, 6.8–7.1 years follow up)		
Clinical outcome	Hypothesized effect on risk	HR	95% CI	AR	HR	95% CI	AR
Coronary heart disease	Decreased	1.24	1.00–1.54	+6 / 10,000 PYs	0.95	0.79–1.15	−3 / 10,000 PYs
Stroke	Decreased	1.31	1.02–1.68	+8 / 10,000 PYs	1.37	1.09–1.73	+12 / 10,000 PYs
Pulmonary embolism	Increased	2.13	1.45–3.11	+10 / 10,000 PYs	1.37	0.90–2.07	+4 / 10,000 PYs
Venous thromboembolism	Increased	2.06	1.57–2.70	+18 / 10,000 PYs	1.32	0.99–1.75	+8 / 10,000 PYs
Breast cancer	Increased	1.24	1.02–1.50	+8 / 10,000 PYs	0.80	0.62–1.04	−6 / 10,000 PYs
Colorectal cancer	Decreased	0.56	0.38–0.81	−7 / 10,000 PYs	1.08	0.75–1.55	+1 / 10,000 PYs
Endometrial cancer	–	0.81	0.48–1.36	−1 / 10,000 PYs	–	–	–
Hip fractures	Decreased	0.67	0.47–0.96	−5 / 10,000 PYs	0.65	0.45–0.94	−7 / 10,000 PYs
Total fractures	Decreased	0.76	0.69–0.83	−47 / 10,000 PYs	0.71	0.64–0.80	−53 / 10,000 PYs
Total mortality	Decreased	0.98	0.82–1.18	−1 / 10,000 PYs	1.04	0.91–1.12	+3 / 10,000 PYs
Global index	–	1.15	1.03–1.28	+19 / 10,000 PYs	1.01	1.09–1.12	+2 / 10,000 PYs
Diabetes	–	0.79	0.67–0.93		0.88	0.77–1.01	
Gallbladder disease	Increased	1.59	1.28–1.97		1.67	1.35–2.06	
Stress incontinence	–	1.87	1.61–2.18		2.15	1.77–2.82	
Urge incontinence	–	1.15	0.99–1.34		1.32	1.10–1.58	
Peripheral artery disease	–	0.89	0.63–1.25		1.32	0.99–1.77	
Probable dementia	Decreased	2.05	1.21–3.48		1.49	0.83–2.66	
Abbreviations: CEs = conjugated estrogens. MPA = medroxyprogesterone acetate. p.o. = per oral. HR = hazard ratio. AR = attributable risk. PYs = person–years. CI = confidence interval. Notes: Sample sizes (n) include placebo recipients, which were about half of patients. "Global index" is defined for each woman as the time to earliest diagnosis for coronary heart disease, stroke, pulmonary embolism, breast cancer, colorectal cancer, endometrial cancer (estrogen plus progestogen group only), hip fractures, and death from other causes. Sources: See template.

Of all the WHI study findings, the HT findings could be argued to have yielded the farthest-reaching societal and economic impacts, and received substantial media attention. Large reductions in HT prescriptions ensued, resulting in a substantial loss of revenue in sales of this class of drugs, with a presumably commensurate savings to patients and insurers. More importantly, in subsequent years, studies have shown a decrease in breast cancer rates in postmenopausal women, attributed to the decline in use of HT. In 2014, an analysis was conducted to determine the economic impact of the estrogen-plus-progestin trial findings, which calculated the net economic return on investment to be $37.1 billion, owing to a combination of averted health-related expenditures and increased number of quality-adjusted life years (QALYs). However, this conclusion has been challenged and another analysis estimated that avoidance of estrogen therapy may have led to the premature deaths of thousands of women aged 50-59 from 2002 to 2012.

The United States Preventive Services Task Force, though initially endorsing hormone replacement, in their most recent published recommendation in 2017 discouraged its use for the prevention of chronic diseases such as osteoporosis or cardiovascular disease. When they first evaluated the impact of HRT in 1996, the USPSTF assigned a "B" grade to hormone replacement therapy for use in primary prevention of chronic conditions in postmenopausal women, basing their results on observational studies and short-term trials. A score of "B" carries an official message of, "The USPSTF recommends the service. There is high certainty that the net benefit is moderate, or there is moderate certainty that the net benefit is moderate to substantial." In light of subsequent results from the Heart and Estrogen/progestin Replacement Study (HERS) and the WHI trials, the USPSTF downgraded the scoring to a "D," which corresponds to a message of, "The USPSTF recommends against the service. There is moderate or high certainty that the service has no net benefit or that the harms outweigh the benefits," and discourages health providers from offering the service or treatment. In 2017 and again in 2022, the USPSTF again evaluated the use of HRT, and again assessed a "D" score. The publication of this most recent recommendation against the use of HRT for the treatment of chronic postmenopausal symptoms was accompanied by several companion editorials, lauding the WHI clinical trial's role in preventing patient harm due to HRT administration, noting also the risks inherent to smaller observational studies, which previously had yielded misleading, potentially harmful recommendations to medical practitioners.

This evidence primarily concerns longer-term HRT use for prevention of chronic disease in older women. The USPSTF did not evaluate HRT's use for alleviation of symptoms of menopause, whereas the North American Menopause Society, the American College of Obstetricians and Gynecologists (ACOG), and the Endocrine Society all continue to recommend it as the most effective therapy for short-term treatment of menopausal symptoms in newly-menopausal women who are under the age of 60 year or within 10 years of entering menopause.

=== Dietary modification ===
The dietary modification (DM) trial was conducted with the purpose of identifying the effects of a low-fat eating pattern; the primary outcome measures were the incidence of invasive breast and colorectal cancers, fatal and nonfatal coronary heart disease (CHD), stroke, and overall cardiovascular disease (CVD), calculated as a composite of CHD and stroke.

Women in the trial were randomly assigned to the dietary intervention group (40%; n = 19541) or the control group (60%; n = 29294). In addition to the global exclusion criteria, component-specific exclusion criteria included prior breast cancer, colorectal cancer, other cancers excluding nonmelanoma skin cancer in the past 10 years, adherence or retention concerns (e.g., a substance abuse history or dementia), or a baseline diet that included a fat intake accounting for less than 32% of total energy intake.

Participants in the intervention group underwent a regimen of trainings, group meetings, and consultations which encouraged low-fat eating habits, targeted to 20% of daily caloric intake, along with increasing the consumption of fruits, vegetables, and grains. Those assigned to the control group were not asked to adopt any specific dietary changes.

==== DM component findings ====
The mean follow-up for the DM intervention was 8.1 years. At study years 1 and 6, the dietary fat intake levels for the intervention group were 10.7% and 8.2% less than those of the control group, respectively. The results indicated that, despite some reduction in CVD risk factors (e.g., blood lipids and diastolic blood pressure), there was no significant reduction in the risk of CHD, stroke, or CVD, indicating that a more focused combination of diet and lifestyle interventions may be required to further improve CVD risk factors and reduce overall risk. In addition, no statistically significant reduction in breast cancer risk was identified, although the results approached significance and indicated that longer-term follow-up may yield a more definitive comparison. The trial also did not identify a reduction in colorectal cancer risk attributable to a low-fat dietary pattern.

=== Calcium/vitamin D ===
The calcium/vitamin D (CaD) trial component was designed to test the hypothesis that women taking a combination of calcium and vitamin D will experience a reduced risk of hip and other fractures, as well as breast and colorectal cancer.

Women participating in this intervention were randomly assigned to receive a regimen of 1000 mg calcium in combination with 400 International Units (IU) of vitamin D (n = 18176) or a placebo (n = 18106), and were followed for an average of 7 years, with monitoring for bone density, fractures, and pathologically confirmed cancers as the measures of outcomes. Women in the CaD trial were already participating in the HT trial, the DM trial, or both. In addition to the global exclusion criteria, component-specific exclusion criteria hypercalcemia, renal calculi, corticosteroid use, and calcitriol use.

==== CaD component findings ====
Among the intervention cohort, a small but significant improvement in hip bone density was observed, although a significant reduction in hip fractures was not observed. However, subgroup analysis revealed a possible benefit to older women in terms of a reduced risk of hip fractures, attributable to calcium plus vitamin D supplementation.

It was also found that the intervention did not have an effect on the incidence of colorectal cancer, possibly owing to the long latency associated with colorectal cancers. Calcium plus vitamin D was not found to affect the incidence of breast cancer. Finally, an increased risk of kidney stones was observed among those taking calcium plus vitamin D.

=== Observational study ===
The Observational study (OS) study recruited eligible postmenopausal women (n = 93676) who were either ineligible or unwilling to participate in the CT portion of the study, for the purpose of obtaining additional risk factor information, identifying risk-related biomarkers, and serving as a comparative observational assessment to the CT interventions.

Participants underwent an initial baseline screening, including the collection of physical measurements, blood specimens, an inventory of medications and supplements, and completion of questionnaires pertaining to medical history, family history, reproductive history, lifestyle and behavioral factors, and quality of life. In addition, more specific information was collected with regard to the participant's geographic residence history, passive (i.e., "second-hand") smoking exposure in childhood and adulthood, early life exposures, details of physical activity, weight and weight-cycling history, and occupational exposures. In addition to the baseline data collected, OS participants received annual questionnaire mailings to update selected exposures and outcomes, and were expected to make an additional clinic visit, to include an additional blood collection, about three years post-enrollment. It was planned that participants would be followed for an average of 9 years.

The major outcomes of interest for the OS were coronary heart disease, stroke, breast cancer, colorectal cancer, osteoporotic fractures, diabetes, and total mortality. Given the size and diversity of the cohort, taken together with the data and specimen collection being undertaken, it was expected that this cohort could yield insights into a variety of hypotheses, as well as generate new hypotheses with respect to disease etiology in women.

==== OS component findings ====
The WHI OS has and continues to yield many findings and new hypotheses, a small sampling of which are highlighted below:

- A decrease in invasive and ductal breast cancer incidences with decreasing estrogen/progestin combination therapy usage among the OS cohort, which served to corroborate the controlled HT CT trial findings. Other cancer surveillance studies have noted the same trend.
- Identification of putative molecular markers which may predispose (and/or aid early detection) certain populations of women to diabetes and breast cancer.
- Recognition that postmenopausal women are less active than they were during their pre-menopausal years, suggesting a possible benefit for interventions at or around perimenopause. Furthermore, this decrease in activity (e.g., prolonged sedentary activity) can lead to an increased CVD risk.
- A correlation between laxative use and an increased risk of falls, for both extrinsic and intrinsic reasons.
- Identification of a positive correlation between active smoking or extensive exposure to second-hand smoke and an increased risk of breast cancer.
- Identification of a potential positive relationship between alcohol use and the risk of developing certain types of hormone-responsive breast cancers.
- An inverse correlation between whole grain consumption and type-2 diabetes, which is in agreement with previous studies; however, this study found the benefit of whole grain consumption to be lost with any history of smoking.
- Insomnia, in combination with a long- (≥10 hours) or short-duration (≤5 hours) sleep pattern, can substantially augment the risk of CVD and CHD.
- A combined analysis of the OS and CT cohorts found no convincing evidence for the influence of multivitamin supplement usage on common cancers, CVD, or total mortality.
- An analysis of outcomes, approximate participant location, and local air quality data found that long-term exposure to fine particulate (PM_{2.5}) air pollution was associated with increased risks of cardiovascular disease and death among postmenopausal women.

== Study extensions, new trials, and the WHI at present ==
The WHI study has received three extensions; these extensions are referred to as "Extension Study 1" (2005-2010), "Extension Study 2" (2010-2015), and "Extension Study 3" (2015-2020). Participants from the first phase of the WHI study were consented and enrolled, with the intention of collecting additional longitudinal data from subjects involved in all of the original study components. The primary outcomes were the same, although greater emphasis was placed on the investigation of cardiovascular disease and aging. Extension Study 1 enrolled 115,403 of the original WHI participants, or 77% of those eligible from the first study phase. Extension Study 2 was able to enroll 93,540 participants, or 87% of those eligible from Extension Study 1. Preliminary estimates for Extension Study 3 participation, as of September 30, 2015, estimate that 36,115 of the Clinical Trial participants and 45,271 Observational Study participants remain active in the WHI study, for a total of 81,386 or 87% of those previously enrolled in Extension Study 2.

=== Long Life Study (LLS) ===
A subsample of the Extension Study 2 participants (n = 7875), aged 63–99 and meeting other eligibility criteria, were consented into the Long Life Study (LLS), the purpose of which was to establish new baselines from which new studies in disease and aging can work. In-person visits were conducted to assess and collect physical and functional measurements, as well as blood to replenish the WHI biospecimen repository and determine current CBC parameters for these participants. The LLS completed its in-person visits and blood collections in May 2013.

A large subset of the LLS participants (n ≈ 7400) were further enrolled in the Objective Physical Activity and Cardiovascular Health in Women (OPACH) study, the purpose of which was to assess physical activity in women capable of ambulation. These women were asked to maintain a week-long sleep log, wear an accelerometer for a week, and keep track of falls on a month basis for one year. The goal was to establish a stronger correlation between physical activity and cardiovascular disease and total mortality.

=== COcoa Supplement and Multivitamin Outcomes Study (COSMOS) ===
The COcoa Supplement and Multivitamin Outcomes Study (COSMOS) at Brigham and Women's Hospital and the Fred Hutchinson Cancer Research Center (Seattle, WA) was a four-year clinical trial with more than 21,000 women and men, recruited from across the U.S. The study was supported by Mars and Pfizer. The objective of the study was to investigate whether either cocoa flavanols (600 mg/day) or a common multivitamin affects the risk of developing heart disease, stroke, and cancer. First results showed no effect on the pre-registered primary endpoints (incidences of heart disease and cancer), but they did show an effect on secondary endpoints with a reduction in heart disease mortality for cocoa flavanols and a reduction of lung cancer risk for multivitamins.

=== Women's Health Initiative Strong & Healthy (WHISH) ===
The Women's Health Initiative Strong and Healthy Study (WHISH), started in 2015 and expected to last four years, seeks to examine the impact of physical activity in older women on certain outcomes such as heart disease and metrics including maintaining an independent lifestyle. The study has enrolled nearly 50,000 participants as of October 2016, whose assigned interventions will include varying physical activity routines, which are monitored by mail and via phone, using an interactive voice response (IVR) system.

=== Other ancillary studies ===
Public health investigators and biostatisticians can apply to use WHI study data in conjunction with their investigations. As of June 2013, nearly 450 Ancillary Studies have been proposed. Newly generated data from these Ancillary Studies must be submitted to the WHI, which in turn provides a richer data resource for subsequent studies.

In addition to the study data, data from genome-wide association studies (GWAS) conducted on participant DNA is available on the NIH-hosted Database of Genotypes and Phenotypes (dbGaP).

=== Significant extension study findings ===
Analysis during the post-intervention period following the estrogen-plus-progestin trial continues to reveal the strong association between estrogen- plus-progestin usage and breast cancer risk. Following the halt of the estrogen-plus-progestin trial, there was a sharp decrease in breast cancer risk in the early post-intervention period, though the hazard ratio remained greater than 1, followed by a sustained risk during the late post-intervention period that was significantly greater than 1. It is hypothesized that the initial decrease was due to the resulting change in the hormone environment, while the subsequent persistent increase in breast cancer incidence may be attributed to the persistence of oncogenic mutations and subsequent expansion of these mutation-harboring cell lineages. The most recent update, published July 28, 2020 in JAMA, reported that increased breast cancer risk has persisted among women randomized to estrogen plus progestin compared with placebo (hazard ratio [HR], 1.28; 95%CI, 1.13 -1.45; P-value < 0.001).

In contrast, breast cancer risk was significantly lower for the estrogen-alone group compared to placebo during the post-intervention period. Specifically, the reduction of breast cancer incidence persisted throughout the early post-intervention phase. Lower breast cancer risk among the estrogen-alone group remained for the most recent update (HR, 0.78; 95%CI, 0.65-0.93; P-value = 0.005). In addition, statistically significantly lower breast cancer mortality was reported (HR, 0.60; 95%CI, 0.37-0.97; P = 0.04).

Regarding endometrial cancer, although estrogen-plus-progestin use during the intervention period suggested a reduction in cancer incidence, the difference became statistically significant with additional follow-up from the extension period. These findings highlight the completely different long-term influences estrogen plus progestin have on endometrial cancer and breast cancer.

According to a cumulative 18-year follow-up analysis published in 2017, it was found that, among 27,347 postmenopausal women who had originally participated in the WHI hormone therapy trials, interventions using estrogen-plus-progestin and estrogen-alone were not associated with increased or decreased risk of all-cause, cardiovascular, or total cancer mortality.

Of note, mortality is a rather limited summary because it does not include non-fatal CVD and non-fatal cancer events that may have long term consequences on health and quality of life. Post-menopausal women considering initiation of HT and their clinicians should refer to previous WHI publications for a complete summary of risks for fatal and non-fatal events.

The Dietary Modification intervention has also yielded new findings, after nearly two decades of follow-up. During the dietary intervention period (median, 8.1 years), it was found that a low-fat dietary pattern led to a lower incidence of death (from all causes) after breast cancer (40 deaths versus 94 in the "normal diet" arm; HR, 0.65; 95% CI, 0.45 to 0.94, P = .02.). After a median 16.1 years of cumulative follow-up (inclusive of the intervention period), further analysis showed that this benefit persisted (234 deaths versus 443 in the "normal diet" arm; HR, 0.82; 95% CI, 0.70 to 0.96 with P = .01). A later update in 2020, with 19.6 years of cumulative follow-up, reported the persistent reduction of death (from all-causes) after breast cancer continued (359 v 652 deaths; HR, 0.85; 95% CI, 0.74 to 0.96; P = .01) and a statistically significant reduction in deaths as a result of breast cancer (breast cancer followed by death directly attributed to the breast cancer) emerged (132 v 251 deaths; HR, 0.79; 95% CI, 0.64 to 0.97; P = .02).

In 2017, another analysis of Dietary Modification intervention outcomes showed a 30% reduction in coronary heart disease (CHD) risk among women having normal blood pressure (n = 23,248) and partaking in a low-fat dietary pattern (122 versus 256 CHD events; HR, 0.70; 95% CI, 0.56 to 0.87 during the intervention period). Participants with existing cardiovascular disease at baseline (n = 1,656) were at higher risk of developing coronary heart disease, both during the intervention and extended follow-up periods (101 versus 116 CHD events, HR, 1.47; 95% CI, 1.12 to 1.93; and 36 versus 44, HR, 1.61 95% CI 1.02 to 2.55, respectively). The increased among women with prior CVD was likely due to post-randomization confounding, resulting in some difficulty in interpretation. Women in the diet intervention group were more likely to report changes in statin use (either cessation or initiation) post-randomization than women in the comparison group.

Secondary analyses concluded that the dietary intervention did not increase risk of diabetes, but instead slowed progression. During the trial, intervention group women had lower rates of initiation of insulin therapy (HR, 0.74; 95% CI, 0.59 to 0.94; P = 0.01) and through cumulative follow-up (HR, 0.88; 95% CI 0.78 to 0.99; P = 0.04).

These types of analysis, conducted more than a decade after the halt of the intervention trials, serves further to demonstrate the long-term value and return on investment yielded by the WHI study.

=== Publications and citations ===
As of September 2018, the WHI has reviewed 3,154 writing proposals, of which 1,725 have been published in scientific journals.

According to a 2013 analysis of extramural clinical trials supported by the NHLBI, the components of the WHI study have been some of the most frequently cited in the literature, with the E+P trial ranking first among all NHLBI-sponsored clinical trials, alone averaging 812.5 citations annually (total average annual number of citations for the WHI study interventions, 1233.3). In addition, the WHI study component findings were found to reach publication in a timely manner, despite the study's negative trial findings (see NEJM Supplementary Appendix for detailed findings).

=== Awards and accolades ===
In 2015, the WHI study was awarded the 2015 Team Science Award from the Association for Clinical and Translational Science (ACTS), "given in recognition of the WHI team's success in the translation of research discoveries into clinical applications and, eventually, widespread clinical practice."

In April 2016, the American Association for Cancer Research (AACR), the oldest and largest research society of its kind, awarded the WHI study the 2016 Team Science Award in recognition of its more than 20 years of work, which ultimately "singularly changed the face of women's medicine around the world."

== Criticisms of the WHI's design and findings and later conclusions about HRT ==
The WHI trial was limited by low adherence, high attrition, inadequate power to detect risks for some outcomes, and evaluation of few regimens. Subsequent to publication of the WHI, controversy arose regarding the applicability of its findings to women just entering menopause. To be properly double blinded, the study required that women not be perimenopausal or have symptoms of menopause. As the average age of menopause is 51, this resulted in an older study population, with an average age of 63. Only 3.5% of the women were 50–54 years of age, the time when women usually decide whether to initiate hormonal therapy for prevention of menopausal symptoms and osteoporosis. Further analysis of WHI data, however, demonstrated that there is no gained preventive benefit in starting hormone therapy soon after menopause for coronary heart disease, stroke, venous thromboembolism or breast cancer.

Most fundamentally, the WHI did not address the major indication for MHT use: relief of symptoms. Rather, the stated goal of the HT component was to test the long-term cardiovascular-protective effects (rather than treatment of menopausal symptoms) of HT in postmenopausal women, which had been supported by previous observational studies in terms of how it reduces atherosclerotic diseases by lowering serum lipid levels and promoting vasodilation. In an expert consensus statement from The Endocrine Society, evidence from the WHI trial was weighted less than that of a randomized controlled trial according to the GRADE system criteria because of mitigating factors: large dropout rate; lack of adequate representation of applicable group of women (i.e. those initiating therapy at the time of menopause); and modifying influences from prior hormone use. Although, the editor of one of the journals which published the results of the WHI called it a "landmark" study, others have noted that the initial conclusions, which led to a massive impact on clinical practice, have been challenged as inaccurate based on further analysis of the findings and subsequent studies. Distorted reporting on the WHI results may have overstated concerns about potential increases in breast cancer incidence and other risks.The double blinding limited validity of study results due to its effects on patient exclusion criteria. The dominant majority of participants were Caucasian, and tended to be slightly overweight and former smokers, with the associated health risks for which these demographics predispose. Furthermore, the focus of the WHI study was disease prevention. Most women take hormone therapy to treat symptoms of menopause rather than for disease prevention and therefore the risks and benefits of hormone therapy in the general population differ from those of the women included in the WHI. Reanalyses of WHI data have indicated that, when other risk factors for breast cancer were taken into account, the reported association between hormone therapy and increased breast cancer rates was not statistically significant.According to a cumulative 18-year follow-up analysis published in 2017, it was found that, among 27,347 postmenopausal women who had originally participated in the WHI hormone therapy trials, interventions using estrogen-plus-progestin and estrogen-alone were not associated with increased or decreased risk of all-cause, cardiovascular, or total cancer mortality.Estrogen therapy alone was associated with reduced risk of developing or dying from breast cancer.

Subsequent WHI publications have acknowledged that hormonal treatment is the most effective option for managing menopausal vasomotor symptoms and report that estrogen alone decreased breast cancer incidence by 23% and breast cancer mortality by 40%. The remaining concern about a slight increase of breast cancer incidence (1 per 1000 women per year) with combined estrogen(CEE)/medroxyprogesterone acetate treatment has also been called into question as has the contention that WHI findings led to a reduction in breast cancer incidence.

Subsequent, updated guidelines align with increasing evidence of a favorable risk/benefit balance for women starting hormone replacement therapy within a younger age window. For example, the North American Menopause Society position statement from 2022 notes that the risk/benefit ratio is favorable when treating vasomotor symptoms and prevention of bone loss in women under 60 or who are within 10 years of menopause onset and have no contraindications. However, for women who initiate treatment over age 60 or more than 10 years from onset of menopause, the risk/benefit balance may be less favorable due to increased absolute risks of coronary heart disease, stroke, venous thromboembolism and dementia. Likewise, the American College of Obstetricians and Gynecologists (ACOG) issued updated guidelines in October 2026, which note that the benefits of hormone replacement therapy may outweigh the risks for the treatment of menopause symptoms for many women younger than 60 years or within ten years of menopause onset.

Several critics have noted that the WHI hormone therapy trials evaluated legacy formulations—conjugated equine estrogens (CEE) and medroxyprogesterone acetate (MPA)—rather than bioidentical 17β-estradiol and micronized progesterone, which are more commonly used in contemporary menopausal hormone therapy. Consequently, extrapolating the WHI's risk estimates to current regimens is controversial, as both molecular composition and route of administration significantly influence safety profiles. Later studies and clinical guidelines have reported that (1) breast cancer risk varies by progestogen, with micronized progesterone showing a more favorable profile than synthetic progestins; and (2) thromboembolic risk is greater with oral estrogens than with transdermal estradiol. On this basis, multiple professional societies now recommend individualized use of transdermal estradiol and micronized progesterone when clinically indicated, therapies not examined in the original WHI trials.

== Other large-scale public health studies ==
Atherosclerosis Risk in Communities (ARIC) study - cohort study of 15,792 men and women in four U.S. communities, which began in 1987, and seeks to identify the underlying causes of atherosclerosis and the resulting clinical outcomes.

Caerphilly Heart Disease Study - cohort study of 2,512 men, set up in a representative population sample drawn from a small town in South Wales, UK. Study has collected wide-ranging data and has focused on risk factors that predict vascular disease, diabetes, cognitive impairment and dementia — and the benefits of living a healthy lifestyle. (1979–present).

Framingham Heart Study - long-term, ongoing cardiovascular study on the residents of Framingham, Massachusetts (1948–present).

Multi-Ethnic Study of Atherosclerosis (MESA) - cohort study of approximately 6,000 men and women in six U.S. communities, which started in 2000, with the purpose of identifying the subclinical (i.e., asymptomatic) characteristics of cardiovascular disease, as well as risk factors that predict progression to a clinical disease state.

Nurses' Health Study - cohort (three cohorts: 1976 and 1989, with a third cohort currently under recruitment) study focusing on the health of female registered nurses.

== See also ==
- Jacques Rossouw, former head of the WHI
